

598001–598100 

|-bgcolor=#FFC2E0
| 598001 ||  || — || February 8, 2008 || Socorro || LINEAR || AMO || align=right data-sort-value="0.28" | 280 m || 
|-id=002 bgcolor=#fefefe
| 598002 ||  || — || January 11, 2008 || Kitt Peak || Spacewatch ||  || align=right data-sort-value="0.84" | 840 m || 
|-id=003 bgcolor=#d6d6d6
| 598003 ||  || — || February 2, 2008 || Mount Lemmon || Mount Lemmon Survey ||  || align=right | 1.9 km || 
|-id=004 bgcolor=#fefefe
| 598004 ||  || — || December 5, 2007 || Mount Lemmon || Mount Lemmon Survey ||  || align=right data-sort-value="0.82" | 820 m || 
|-id=005 bgcolor=#E9E9E9
| 598005 ||  || — || February 7, 2008 || Mount Lemmon || Mount Lemmon Survey ||  || align=right | 2.0 km || 
|-id=006 bgcolor=#fefefe
| 598006 ||  || — || February 7, 2008 || Mount Lemmon || Mount Lemmon Survey ||  || align=right data-sort-value="0.57" | 570 m || 
|-id=007 bgcolor=#E9E9E9
| 598007 ||  || — || February 8, 2008 || Dauban || F. Kugel ||  || align=right | 1.0 km || 
|-id=008 bgcolor=#fefefe
| 598008 ||  || — || December 15, 2007 || Kitt Peak || Spacewatch ||  || align=right | 1.3 km || 
|-id=009 bgcolor=#fefefe
| 598009 ||  || — || October 19, 2003 || Kitt Peak || Spacewatch ||  || align=right data-sort-value="0.68" | 680 m || 
|-id=010 bgcolor=#E9E9E9
| 598010 ||  || — || February 7, 2008 || Kitt Peak || Spacewatch ||  || align=right | 1.1 km || 
|-id=011 bgcolor=#E9E9E9
| 598011 ||  || — || December 30, 2007 || Kitt Peak || Spacewatch ||  || align=right data-sort-value="0.75" | 750 m || 
|-id=012 bgcolor=#fefefe
| 598012 ||  || — || January 10, 2008 || Mount Lemmon || Mount Lemmon Survey ||  || align=right data-sort-value="0.85" | 850 m || 
|-id=013 bgcolor=#fefefe
| 598013 ||  || — || February 8, 2008 || Mount Lemmon || Mount Lemmon Survey ||  || align=right data-sort-value="0.69" | 690 m || 
|-id=014 bgcolor=#fefefe
| 598014 ||  || — || November 4, 2007 || Kitt Peak || Spacewatch ||  || align=right data-sort-value="0.68" | 680 m || 
|-id=015 bgcolor=#fefefe
| 598015 ||  || — || February 10, 2008 || Kitt Peak || Spacewatch ||  || align=right data-sort-value="0.70" | 700 m || 
|-id=016 bgcolor=#d6d6d6
| 598016 ||  || — || February 10, 2008 || Mount Lemmon || Mount Lemmon Survey ||  || align=right | 1.6 km || 
|-id=017 bgcolor=#fefefe
| 598017 ||  || — || September 19, 2006 || Kitt Peak || Spacewatch ||  || align=right data-sort-value="0.65" | 650 m || 
|-id=018 bgcolor=#fefefe
| 598018 ||  || — || February 7, 2008 || Mount Lemmon || Mount Lemmon Survey ||  || align=right data-sort-value="0.62" | 620 m || 
|-id=019 bgcolor=#d6d6d6
| 598019 ||  || — || February 8, 2008 || Kitt Peak || Spacewatch ||  || align=right | 2.3 km || 
|-id=020 bgcolor=#d6d6d6
| 598020 ||  || — || September 19, 2006 || Catalina || CSS ||  || align=right | 1.9 km || 
|-id=021 bgcolor=#fefefe
| 598021 ||  || — || February 9, 2008 || Kitt Peak || Spacewatch ||  || align=right data-sort-value="0.66" | 660 m || 
|-id=022 bgcolor=#d6d6d6
| 598022 ||  || — || February 10, 2008 || Mount Lemmon || Mount Lemmon Survey ||  || align=right | 2.2 km || 
|-id=023 bgcolor=#fefefe
| 598023 ||  || — || January 31, 2008 || Catalina || CSS ||  || align=right data-sort-value="0.82" | 820 m || 
|-id=024 bgcolor=#fefefe
| 598024 ||  || — || February 13, 2008 || Mount Lemmon || Mount Lemmon Survey ||  || align=right data-sort-value="0.71" | 710 m || 
|-id=025 bgcolor=#fefefe
| 598025 ||  || — || February 2, 2008 || Kitt Peak || Spacewatch ||  || align=right data-sort-value="0.46" | 460 m || 
|-id=026 bgcolor=#d6d6d6
| 598026 ||  || — || February 7, 2008 || Mount Lemmon || Mount Lemmon Survey ||  || align=right | 2.4 km || 
|-id=027 bgcolor=#fefefe
| 598027 ||  || — || February 10, 2008 || Mount Lemmon || Mount Lemmon Survey ||  || align=right data-sort-value="0.67" | 670 m || 
|-id=028 bgcolor=#d6d6d6
| 598028 ||  || — || April 29, 2014 || Haleakala || Pan-STARRS ||  || align=right | 1.9 km || 
|-id=029 bgcolor=#fefefe
| 598029 ||  || — || February 8, 2008 || Kitt Peak || Spacewatch ||  || align=right data-sort-value="0.73" | 730 m || 
|-id=030 bgcolor=#fefefe
| 598030 ||  || — || February 12, 2008 || Kitt Peak || Spacewatch ||  || align=right data-sort-value="0.52" | 520 m || 
|-id=031 bgcolor=#fefefe
| 598031 ||  || — || February 2, 2008 || Mount Lemmon || Mount Lemmon Survey ||  || align=right data-sort-value="0.65" | 650 m || 
|-id=032 bgcolor=#d6d6d6
| 598032 ||  || — || February 10, 2008 || Mount Lemmon || Mount Lemmon Survey ||  || align=right | 1.7 km || 
|-id=033 bgcolor=#d6d6d6
| 598033 ||  || — || January 20, 2013 || Mount Lemmon || Mount Lemmon Survey ||  || align=right | 2.1 km || 
|-id=034 bgcolor=#fefefe
| 598034 ||  || — || February 7, 2008 || Mount Lemmon || Mount Lemmon Survey ||  || align=right data-sort-value="0.62" | 620 m || 
|-id=035 bgcolor=#fefefe
| 598035 ||  || — || March 14, 2012 || Mount Lemmon || Mount Lemmon Survey ||  || align=right data-sort-value="0.61" | 610 m || 
|-id=036 bgcolor=#fefefe
| 598036 ||  || — || October 13, 2010 || Mount Lemmon || Mount Lemmon Survey ||  || align=right data-sort-value="0.69" | 690 m || 
|-id=037 bgcolor=#d6d6d6
| 598037 ||  || — || February 8, 2008 || Mount Lemmon || Mount Lemmon Survey ||  || align=right | 1.7 km || 
|-id=038 bgcolor=#fefefe
| 598038 ||  || — || September 20, 1995 || Kitt Peak || Spacewatch ||  || align=right data-sort-value="0.61" | 610 m || 
|-id=039 bgcolor=#d6d6d6
| 598039 ||  || — || February 13, 2008 || Mount Lemmon || Mount Lemmon Survey ||  || align=right | 1.8 km || 
|-id=040 bgcolor=#d6d6d6
| 598040 ||  || — || April 8, 2014 || Haleakala || Pan-STARRS ||  || align=right | 2.0 km || 
|-id=041 bgcolor=#fefefe
| 598041 ||  || — || January 13, 2008 || Kitt Peak || Spacewatch ||  || align=right data-sort-value="0.60" | 600 m || 
|-id=042 bgcolor=#fefefe
| 598042 ||  || — || February 12, 2008 || Mount Lemmon || Mount Lemmon Survey ||  || align=right data-sort-value="0.77" | 770 m || 
|-id=043 bgcolor=#d6d6d6
| 598043 ||  || — || January 20, 2013 || Mount Lemmon || Mount Lemmon Survey ||  || align=right | 2.1 km || 
|-id=044 bgcolor=#fefefe
| 598044 ||  || — || October 2, 2010 || Kitt Peak || Spacewatch ||  || align=right data-sort-value="0.59" | 590 m || 
|-id=045 bgcolor=#d6d6d6
| 598045 ||  || — || February 9, 2008 || Mount Lemmon || Mount Lemmon Survey ||  || align=right | 2.8 km || 
|-id=046 bgcolor=#fefefe
| 598046 ||  || — || March 28, 2012 || Kitt Peak || Spacewatch ||  || align=right data-sort-value="0.60" | 600 m || 
|-id=047 bgcolor=#d6d6d6
| 598047 ||  || — || May 5, 2014 || Cerro Tololo-DECam || CTIO-DECam ||  || align=right | 1.9 km || 
|-id=048 bgcolor=#d6d6d6
| 598048 ||  || — || February 8, 2008 || Kitt Peak || Spacewatch ||  || align=right | 2.1 km || 
|-id=049 bgcolor=#d6d6d6
| 598049 ||  || — || February 9, 2008 || Mount Lemmon || Mount Lemmon Survey ||  || align=right | 1.9 km || 
|-id=050 bgcolor=#fefefe
| 598050 ||  || — || February 12, 2008 || Kitt Peak || Spacewatch ||  || align=right data-sort-value="0.52" | 520 m || 
|-id=051 bgcolor=#d6d6d6
| 598051 ||  || — || February 8, 2008 || Mount Lemmon || Mount Lemmon Survey ||  || align=right | 2.4 km || 
|-id=052 bgcolor=#FA8072
| 598052 ||  || — || February 9, 2008 || Mount Lemmon || Mount Lemmon Survey ||  || align=right data-sort-value="0.44" | 440 m || 
|-id=053 bgcolor=#fefefe
| 598053 ||  || — || February 7, 2008 || Kitt Peak || Spacewatch ||  || align=right data-sort-value="0.59" | 590 m || 
|-id=054 bgcolor=#E9E9E9
| 598054 ||  || — || February 9, 2008 || Mount Lemmon || Mount Lemmon Survey ||  || align=right | 1.4 km || 
|-id=055 bgcolor=#d6d6d6
| 598055 ||  || — || January 12, 2008 || Mount Lemmon || Mount Lemmon Survey || 3:2 || align=right | 4.2 km || 
|-id=056 bgcolor=#fefefe
| 598056 ||  || — || February 28, 2008 || Kitt Peak || Spacewatch ||  || align=right data-sort-value="0.58" | 580 m || 
|-id=057 bgcolor=#fefefe
| 598057 ||  || — || June 17, 2005 || Mount Lemmon || Mount Lemmon Survey ||  || align=right data-sort-value="0.63" | 630 m || 
|-id=058 bgcolor=#d6d6d6
| 598058 ||  || — || February 28, 2008 || Kitt Peak || Spacewatch ||  || align=right | 2.7 km || 
|-id=059 bgcolor=#d6d6d6
| 598059 ||  || — || February 1, 2008 || Kitt Peak || Spacewatch ||  || align=right | 2.0 km || 
|-id=060 bgcolor=#fefefe
| 598060 ||  || — || February 28, 2008 || Mount Lemmon || Mount Lemmon Survey ||  || align=right data-sort-value="0.70" | 700 m || 
|-id=061 bgcolor=#fefefe
| 598061 ||  || — || January 13, 2011 || Kitt Peak || Spacewatch ||  || align=right | 1.2 km || 
|-id=062 bgcolor=#fefefe
| 598062 ||  || — || February 18, 2008 || Mount Lemmon || Mount Lemmon Survey || H || align=right data-sort-value="0.58" | 580 m || 
|-id=063 bgcolor=#fefefe
| 598063 ||  || — || February 3, 2008 || Kitt Peak || Spacewatch ||  || align=right data-sort-value="0.70" | 700 m || 
|-id=064 bgcolor=#fefefe
| 598064 ||  || — || February 11, 2008 || Kitt Peak || Spacewatch ||  || align=right data-sort-value="0.63" | 630 m || 
|-id=065 bgcolor=#fefefe
| 598065 ||  || — || January 16, 2015 || Haleakala || Pan-STARRS ||  || align=right data-sort-value="0.54" | 540 m || 
|-id=066 bgcolor=#fefefe
| 598066 ||  || — || February 25, 2008 || Mount Lemmon || Mount Lemmon Survey ||  || align=right data-sort-value="0.58" | 580 m || 
|-id=067 bgcolor=#fefefe
| 598067 ||  || — || February 27, 2008 || Kitt Peak || Spacewatch ||  || align=right data-sort-value="0.62" | 620 m || 
|-id=068 bgcolor=#d6d6d6
| 598068 ||  || — || February 28, 2008 || Mount Lemmon || Mount Lemmon Survey ||  || align=right | 1.7 km || 
|-id=069 bgcolor=#fefefe
| 598069 ||  || — || January 17, 2008 || Kitt Peak || Spacewatch ||  || align=right data-sort-value="0.65" | 650 m || 
|-id=070 bgcolor=#d6d6d6
| 598070 ||  || — || March 6, 2008 || Kachina || J. Hobart || THB || align=right | 3.0 km || 
|-id=071 bgcolor=#d6d6d6
| 598071 ||  || — || March 1, 2008 || Kitt Peak || Spacewatch ||  || align=right | 2.1 km || 
|-id=072 bgcolor=#E9E9E9
| 598072 ||  || — || March 2, 2008 || Mount Lemmon || Mount Lemmon Survey ||  || align=right | 1.7 km || 
|-id=073 bgcolor=#C2FFFF
| 598073 ||  || — || March 4, 2008 || Mount Lemmon || Mount Lemmon Survey || L5 || align=right | 10 km || 
|-id=074 bgcolor=#fefefe
| 598074 ||  || — || June 16, 2005 || Mount Lemmon || Mount Lemmon Survey ||  || align=right data-sort-value="0.64" | 640 m || 
|-id=075 bgcolor=#d6d6d6
| 598075 ||  || — || September 20, 1995 || Kitt Peak || Spacewatch ||  || align=right | 2.0 km || 
|-id=076 bgcolor=#d6d6d6
| 598076 ||  || — || March 2, 2008 || Mount Lemmon || Mount Lemmon Survey ||  || align=right | 2.0 km || 
|-id=077 bgcolor=#d6d6d6
| 598077 ||  || — || March 2, 2008 || Mount Lemmon || Mount Lemmon Survey ||  || align=right | 2.1 km || 
|-id=078 bgcolor=#fefefe
| 598078 ||  || — || March 2, 2008 || Mount Lemmon || Mount Lemmon Survey ||  || align=right data-sort-value="0.73" | 730 m || 
|-id=079 bgcolor=#d6d6d6
| 598079 ||  || — || February 28, 2008 || Mount Lemmon || Mount Lemmon Survey ||  || align=right | 2.0 km || 
|-id=080 bgcolor=#fefefe
| 598080 ||  || — || June 6, 2005 || Kitt Peak || Spacewatch ||  || align=right data-sort-value="0.92" | 920 m || 
|-id=081 bgcolor=#fefefe
| 598081 ||  || — || November 11, 2006 || Kitt Peak || Spacewatch ||  || align=right | 1.00 km || 
|-id=082 bgcolor=#d6d6d6
| 598082 ||  || — || September 26, 2006 || Mount Lemmon || Mount Lemmon Survey ||  || align=right | 2.0 km || 
|-id=083 bgcolor=#fefefe
| 598083 ||  || — || March 9, 2008 || Mount Lemmon || Mount Lemmon Survey ||  || align=right data-sort-value="0.64" | 640 m || 
|-id=084 bgcolor=#fefefe
| 598084 ||  || — || October 1, 2006 || Kitt Peak || Spacewatch ||  || align=right data-sort-value="0.70" | 700 m || 
|-id=085 bgcolor=#d6d6d6
| 598085 ||  || — || March 9, 2008 || Mount Lemmon || Mount Lemmon Survey ||  || align=right | 1.9 km || 
|-id=086 bgcolor=#d6d6d6
| 598086 ||  || — || March 9, 2008 || Mount Lemmon || Mount Lemmon Survey ||  || align=right | 2.1 km || 
|-id=087 bgcolor=#d6d6d6
| 598087 ||  || — || March 8, 2008 || Mount Lemmon || Mount Lemmon Survey ||  || align=right | 2.6 km || 
|-id=088 bgcolor=#d6d6d6
| 598088 ||  || — || March 5, 2008 || Mount Lemmon || Mount Lemmon Survey ||  || align=right | 2.8 km || 
|-id=089 bgcolor=#d6d6d6
| 598089 ||  || — || March 6, 2008 || Mount Lemmon || Mount Lemmon Survey ||  || align=right | 2.3 km || 
|-id=090 bgcolor=#fefefe
| 598090 ||  || — || February 8, 2008 || Mount Lemmon || Mount Lemmon Survey ||  || align=right data-sort-value="0.70" | 700 m || 
|-id=091 bgcolor=#d6d6d6
| 598091 ||  || — || March 7, 2008 || Mount Lemmon || Mount Lemmon Survey ||  || align=right | 2.3 km || 
|-id=092 bgcolor=#d6d6d6
| 598092 ||  || — || February 9, 2008 || Kitt Peak || Spacewatch ||  || align=right | 2.1 km || 
|-id=093 bgcolor=#fefefe
| 598093 ||  || — || March 1, 2008 || Kitt Peak || Spacewatch ||  || align=right data-sort-value="0.78" | 780 m || 
|-id=094 bgcolor=#d6d6d6
| 598094 ||  || — || October 20, 1995 || Kitt Peak || Spacewatch ||  || align=right | 2.6 km || 
|-id=095 bgcolor=#fefefe
| 598095 ||  || — || March 8, 2008 || Kitt Peak || Spacewatch ||  || align=right data-sort-value="0.66" | 660 m || 
|-id=096 bgcolor=#d6d6d6
| 598096 ||  || — || March 10, 2008 || Mount Lemmon || Mount Lemmon Survey ||  || align=right | 2.7 km || 
|-id=097 bgcolor=#d6d6d6
| 598097 ||  || — || March 10, 2008 || Mount Lemmon || Mount Lemmon Survey ||  || align=right | 2.5 km || 
|-id=098 bgcolor=#d6d6d6
| 598098 ||  || — || February 10, 2008 || Kitt Peak || Spacewatch ||  || align=right | 2.2 km || 
|-id=099 bgcolor=#d6d6d6
| 598099 ||  || — || March 11, 2008 || Mount Lemmon || Mount Lemmon Survey ||  || align=right | 2.6 km || 
|-id=100 bgcolor=#E9E9E9
| 598100 ||  || — || March 12, 2008 || Kitt Peak || Spacewatch ||  || align=right | 1.6 km || 
|}

598101–598200 

|-bgcolor=#fefefe
| 598101 ||  || — || March 8, 2008 || Mount Lemmon || Mount Lemmon Survey ||  || align=right data-sort-value="0.55" | 550 m || 
|-id=102 bgcolor=#d6d6d6
| 598102 ||  || — || March 12, 2008 || Kitt Peak || Spacewatch ||  || align=right | 1.9 km || 
|-id=103 bgcolor=#fefefe
| 598103 ||  || — || March 4, 2012 || Mount Lemmon || Mount Lemmon Survey ||  || align=right data-sort-value="0.70" | 700 m || 
|-id=104 bgcolor=#fefefe
| 598104 ||  || — || March 6, 2008 || Mount Lemmon || Mount Lemmon Survey ||  || align=right data-sort-value="0.94" | 940 m || 
|-id=105 bgcolor=#fefefe
| 598105 ||  || — || February 13, 2015 || Mount Lemmon || Mount Lemmon Survey ||  || align=right data-sort-value="0.77" | 770 m || 
|-id=106 bgcolor=#d6d6d6
| 598106 ||  || — || March 10, 2008 || Kitt Peak || Spacewatch ||  || align=right | 1.9 km || 
|-id=107 bgcolor=#d6d6d6
| 598107 ||  || — || February 7, 2013 || Kitt Peak || Spacewatch ||  || align=right | 2.0 km || 
|-id=108 bgcolor=#d6d6d6
| 598108 ||  || — || October 25, 2011 || Haleakala || Pan-STARRS ||  || align=right | 1.9 km || 
|-id=109 bgcolor=#fefefe
| 598109 ||  || — || March 2, 2013 || Mount Lemmon || Mount Lemmon Survey || H || align=right data-sort-value="0.50" | 500 m || 
|-id=110 bgcolor=#fefefe
| 598110 ||  || — || March 2, 2008 || Mount Lemmon || Mount Lemmon Survey ||  || align=right data-sort-value="0.76" | 760 m || 
|-id=111 bgcolor=#d6d6d6
| 598111 ||  || — || February 9, 2008 || Kitt Peak || Spacewatch ||  || align=right | 2.3 km || 
|-id=112 bgcolor=#fefefe
| 598112 ||  || — || March 15, 2008 || Kitt Peak || Spacewatch ||  || align=right data-sort-value="0.64" | 640 m || 
|-id=113 bgcolor=#d6d6d6
| 598113 ||  || — || July 25, 2015 || Haleakala || Pan-STARRS ||  || align=right | 1.8 km || 
|-id=114 bgcolor=#fefefe
| 598114 ||  || — || March 10, 2008 || Kitt Peak || Spacewatch ||  || align=right data-sort-value="0.57" | 570 m || 
|-id=115 bgcolor=#fefefe
| 598115 ||  || — || January 15, 2015 || Mount Lemmon || Mount Lemmon Survey ||  || align=right data-sort-value="0.66" | 660 m || 
|-id=116 bgcolor=#d6d6d6
| 598116 ||  || — || January 17, 2013 || Haleakala || Pan-STARRS ||  || align=right | 2.0 km || 
|-id=117 bgcolor=#fefefe
| 598117 ||  || — || June 11, 2012 || Haleakala || Pan-STARRS ||  || align=right data-sort-value="0.90" | 900 m || 
|-id=118 bgcolor=#d6d6d6
| 598118 ||  || — || February 14, 2013 || Kitt Peak || Spacewatch ||  || align=right | 2.2 km || 
|-id=119 bgcolor=#d6d6d6
| 598119 ||  || — || September 25, 2015 || Mount Lemmon || Mount Lemmon Survey ||  || align=right | 2.2 km || 
|-id=120 bgcolor=#fefefe
| 598120 ||  || — || March 28, 2012 || Kitt Peak || Spacewatch ||  || align=right data-sort-value="0.59" | 590 m || 
|-id=121 bgcolor=#d6d6d6
| 598121 ||  || — || August 15, 2009 || Catalina || CSS ||  || align=right | 3.0 km || 
|-id=122 bgcolor=#d6d6d6
| 598122 ||  || — || March 11, 2008 || Mount Lemmon || Mount Lemmon Survey ||  || align=right | 2.8 km || 
|-id=123 bgcolor=#d6d6d6
| 598123 ||  || — || March 7, 2008 || Mount Lemmon || Mount Lemmon Survey ||  || align=right | 2.2 km || 
|-id=124 bgcolor=#fefefe
| 598124 ||  || — || March 5, 2008 || Mount Lemmon || Mount Lemmon Survey ||  || align=right data-sort-value="0.61" | 610 m || 
|-id=125 bgcolor=#d6d6d6
| 598125 ||  || — || March 6, 2008 || Mount Lemmon || Mount Lemmon Survey ||  || align=right | 1.9 km || 
|-id=126 bgcolor=#d6d6d6
| 598126 ||  || — || March 11, 2008 || Kitt Peak || Spacewatch ||  || align=right | 1.6 km || 
|-id=127 bgcolor=#E9E9E9
| 598127 ||  || — || March 10, 2008 || Kitt Peak || Spacewatch ||  || align=right | 1.7 km || 
|-id=128 bgcolor=#fefefe
| 598128 ||  || — || September 18, 2006 || Kitt Peak || Spacewatch ||  || align=right data-sort-value="0.74" | 740 m || 
|-id=129 bgcolor=#d6d6d6
| 598129 ||  || — || March 27, 2008 || Kitt Peak || Spacewatch ||  || align=right | 2.1 km || 
|-id=130 bgcolor=#d6d6d6
| 598130 ||  || — || March 28, 2008 || Mount Lemmon || Mount Lemmon Survey ||  || align=right | 1.9 km || 
|-id=131 bgcolor=#fefefe
| 598131 ||  || — || March 28, 2008 || Kitt Peak || Spacewatch ||  || align=right data-sort-value="0.52" | 520 m || 
|-id=132 bgcolor=#fefefe
| 598132 ||  || — || March 28, 2008 || Mount Lemmon || Mount Lemmon Survey ||  || align=right data-sort-value="0.53" | 530 m || 
|-id=133 bgcolor=#d6d6d6
| 598133 ||  || — || March 12, 2008 || Kitt Peak || Spacewatch ||  || align=right | 2.1 km || 
|-id=134 bgcolor=#d6d6d6
| 598134 ||  || — || March 8, 2008 || Kitt Peak || Spacewatch ||  || align=right | 1.8 km || 
|-id=135 bgcolor=#d6d6d6
| 598135 ||  || — || March 28, 2008 || Kitt Peak || Spacewatch ||  || align=right | 2.3 km || 
|-id=136 bgcolor=#d6d6d6
| 598136 ||  || — || March 13, 2008 || Kitt Peak || Spacewatch ||  || align=right | 2.2 km || 
|-id=137 bgcolor=#d6d6d6
| 598137 ||  || — || March 28, 2008 || Mount Lemmon || Mount Lemmon Survey ||  || align=right | 2.3 km || 
|-id=138 bgcolor=#fefefe
| 598138 ||  || — || February 10, 2008 || Kitt Peak || Spacewatch ||  || align=right data-sort-value="0.64" | 640 m || 
|-id=139 bgcolor=#d6d6d6
| 598139 ||  || — || March 29, 2008 || Catalina || CSS ||  || align=right | 2.4 km || 
|-id=140 bgcolor=#fefefe
| 598140 ||  || — || March 27, 2008 || Kitt Peak || Spacewatch ||  || align=right data-sort-value="0.64" | 640 m || 
|-id=141 bgcolor=#d6d6d6
| 598141 ||  || — || March 4, 2008 || Mount Lemmon || Mount Lemmon Survey ||  || align=right | 2.0 km || 
|-id=142 bgcolor=#d6d6d6
| 598142 ||  || — || December 27, 2006 || Mount Lemmon || Mount Lemmon Survey || 3:2 || align=right | 2.9 km || 
|-id=143 bgcolor=#d6d6d6
| 598143 ||  || — || March 27, 2008 || Mount Lemmon || Mount Lemmon Survey ||  || align=right | 1.9 km || 
|-id=144 bgcolor=#fefefe
| 598144 ||  || — || March 28, 2008 || Mount Lemmon || Mount Lemmon Survey ||  || align=right data-sort-value="0.67" | 670 m || 
|-id=145 bgcolor=#d6d6d6
| 598145 ||  || — || November 19, 2006 || Kitt Peak || Spacewatch || 3:2 || align=right | 3.3 km || 
|-id=146 bgcolor=#d6d6d6
| 598146 ||  || — || March 31, 2008 || Mount Lemmon || Mount Lemmon Survey ||  || align=right | 2.3 km || 
|-id=147 bgcolor=#d6d6d6
| 598147 ||  || — || December 27, 2006 || Mount Lemmon || Mount Lemmon Survey ||  || align=right | 2.5 km || 
|-id=148 bgcolor=#E9E9E9
| 598148 ||  || — || March 31, 2008 || Mount Lemmon || Mount Lemmon Survey ||  || align=right | 2.5 km || 
|-id=149 bgcolor=#d6d6d6
| 598149 ||  || — || September 13, 2004 || Kitt Peak || Spacewatch ||  || align=right | 3.2 km || 
|-id=150 bgcolor=#d6d6d6
| 598150 ||  || — || December 14, 2006 || Kitt Peak || Spacewatch ||  || align=right | 2.1 km || 
|-id=151 bgcolor=#E9E9E9
| 598151 ||  || — || March 27, 2008 || Mount Lemmon || Mount Lemmon Survey ||  || align=right data-sort-value="0.92" | 920 m || 
|-id=152 bgcolor=#fefefe
| 598152 ||  || — || March 30, 2008 || Kitt Peak || Spacewatch ||  || align=right data-sort-value="0.69" | 690 m || 
|-id=153 bgcolor=#fefefe
| 598153 ||  || — || March 28, 2008 || Mount Lemmon || Mount Lemmon Survey ||  || align=right data-sort-value="0.84" | 840 m || 
|-id=154 bgcolor=#d6d6d6
| 598154 ||  || — || March 31, 2008 || Mount Lemmon || Mount Lemmon Survey ||  || align=right | 2.2 km || 
|-id=155 bgcolor=#d6d6d6
| 598155 ||  || — || March 29, 2008 || Kitt Peak || Spacewatch ||  || align=right | 2.3 km || 
|-id=156 bgcolor=#fefefe
| 598156 ||  || — || March 31, 2008 || Mount Lemmon || Mount Lemmon Survey ||  || align=right data-sort-value="0.63" | 630 m || 
|-id=157 bgcolor=#d6d6d6
| 598157 ||  || — || July 19, 2015 || Haleakala || Pan-STARRS ||  || align=right | 2.5 km || 
|-id=158 bgcolor=#d6d6d6
| 598158 ||  || — || March 10, 2008 || Kitt Peak || Spacewatch ||  || align=right | 1.9 km || 
|-id=159 bgcolor=#d6d6d6
| 598159 ||  || — || March 28, 2008 || Mount Lemmon || Mount Lemmon Survey ||  || align=right | 2.3 km || 
|-id=160 bgcolor=#d6d6d6
| 598160 ||  || — || February 9, 2013 || Haleakala || Pan-STARRS ||  || align=right | 1.9 km || 
|-id=161 bgcolor=#d6d6d6
| 598161 ||  || — || March 7, 2013 || Mount Lemmon || Mount Lemmon Survey ||  || align=right | 2.1 km || 
|-id=162 bgcolor=#d6d6d6
| 598162 ||  || — || September 16, 2010 || Kitt Peak || Spacewatch ||  || align=right | 2.2 km || 
|-id=163 bgcolor=#fefefe
| 598163 ||  || — || September 21, 2009 || Mount Lemmon || Mount Lemmon Survey ||  || align=right data-sort-value="0.64" | 640 m || 
|-id=164 bgcolor=#fefefe
| 598164 ||  || — || March 29, 2008 || Kitt Peak || Spacewatch ||  || align=right data-sort-value="0.65" | 650 m || 
|-id=165 bgcolor=#fefefe
| 598165 ||  || — || March 27, 2008 || Mount Lemmon || Mount Lemmon Survey ||  || align=right data-sort-value="0.66" | 660 m || 
|-id=166 bgcolor=#d6d6d6
| 598166 ||  || — || March 31, 2008 || Mount Lemmon || Mount Lemmon Survey ||  || align=right | 2.3 km || 
|-id=167 bgcolor=#fefefe
| 598167 ||  || — || March 27, 2008 || Mount Lemmon || Mount Lemmon Survey ||  || align=right data-sort-value="0.62" | 620 m || 
|-id=168 bgcolor=#d6d6d6
| 598168 ||  || — || April 7, 2008 || Eskridge || G. Hug ||  || align=right | 2.6 km || 
|-id=169 bgcolor=#fefefe
| 598169 ||  || — || April 1, 2008 || Kitt Peak || Spacewatch ||  || align=right data-sort-value="0.75" | 750 m || 
|-id=170 bgcolor=#fefefe
| 598170 ||  || — || April 1, 2008 || Kitt Peak || Spacewatch ||  || align=right data-sort-value="0.67" | 670 m || 
|-id=171 bgcolor=#d6d6d6
| 598171 ||  || — || October 2, 2005 || Mount Lemmon || Mount Lemmon Survey ||  || align=right | 2.1 km || 
|-id=172 bgcolor=#E9E9E9
| 598172 ||  || — || December 22, 2006 || Kitt Peak || Spacewatch ||  || align=right | 1.1 km || 
|-id=173 bgcolor=#fefefe
| 598173 ||  || — || April 12, 2008 || Desert Eagle || W. K. Y. Yeung ||  || align=right data-sort-value="0.66" | 660 m || 
|-id=174 bgcolor=#d6d6d6
| 598174 ||  || — || April 1, 2008 || Mount Lemmon || Mount Lemmon Survey ||  || align=right | 2.1 km || 
|-id=175 bgcolor=#fefefe
| 598175 ||  || — || April 3, 2008 || Kitt Peak || Spacewatch ||  || align=right data-sort-value="0.68" | 680 m || 
|-id=176 bgcolor=#d6d6d6
| 598176 ||  || — || March 10, 2008 || Kitt Peak || Spacewatch ||  || align=right | 2.4 km || 
|-id=177 bgcolor=#d6d6d6
| 598177 ||  || — || April 3, 2008 || Kitt Peak || Spacewatch ||  || align=right | 2.4 km || 
|-id=178 bgcolor=#d6d6d6
| 598178 ||  || — || April 3, 2008 || Mount Lemmon || Mount Lemmon Survey ||  || align=right | 2.0 km || 
|-id=179 bgcolor=#d6d6d6
| 598179 ||  || — || April 4, 2008 || Kitt Peak || Spacewatch ||  || align=right | 2.5 km || 
|-id=180 bgcolor=#d6d6d6
| 598180 ||  || — || April 5, 2008 || Mount Lemmon || Mount Lemmon Survey ||  || align=right | 2.4 km || 
|-id=181 bgcolor=#d6d6d6
| 598181 ||  || — || April 5, 2008 || Mount Lemmon || Mount Lemmon Survey ||  || align=right | 2.6 km || 
|-id=182 bgcolor=#fefefe
| 598182 ||  || — || April 5, 2008 || Mount Lemmon || Mount Lemmon Survey ||  || align=right data-sort-value="0.78" | 780 m || 
|-id=183 bgcolor=#fefefe
| 598183 ||  || — || April 5, 2008 || Mount Lemmon || Mount Lemmon Survey ||  || align=right data-sort-value="0.65" | 650 m || 
|-id=184 bgcolor=#C2FFFF
| 598184 ||  || — || April 5, 2008 || Mount Lemmon || Mount Lemmon Survey || L5 || align=right | 6.8 km || 
|-id=185 bgcolor=#E9E9E9
| 598185 ||  || — || April 5, 2008 || Mount Lemmon || Mount Lemmon Survey ||  || align=right | 1.9 km || 
|-id=186 bgcolor=#fefefe
| 598186 ||  || — || March 12, 2008 || Mount Lemmon || Mount Lemmon Survey ||  || align=right data-sort-value="0.73" | 730 m || 
|-id=187 bgcolor=#fefefe
| 598187 ||  || — || July 27, 2005 || Palomar || NEAT || V || align=right data-sort-value="0.92" | 920 m || 
|-id=188 bgcolor=#fefefe
| 598188 ||  || — || April 5, 2008 || Kitt Peak || Spacewatch ||  || align=right data-sort-value="0.64" | 640 m || 
|-id=189 bgcolor=#fefefe
| 598189 ||  || — || April 6, 2008 || Kitt Peak || Spacewatch ||  || align=right | 1.00 km || 
|-id=190 bgcolor=#d6d6d6
| 598190 ||  || — || April 6, 2008 || Mount Lemmon || Mount Lemmon Survey ||  || align=right | 2.5 km || 
|-id=191 bgcolor=#d6d6d6
| 598191 ||  || — || April 7, 2008 || Kitt Peak || Spacewatch ||  || align=right | 2.4 km || 
|-id=192 bgcolor=#d6d6d6
| 598192 ||  || — || April 7, 2008 || Kitt Peak || Spacewatch ||  || align=right | 3.2 km || 
|-id=193 bgcolor=#fefefe
| 598193 ||  || — || April 7, 2008 || Kitt Peak || Spacewatch ||  || align=right data-sort-value="0.80" | 800 m || 
|-id=194 bgcolor=#d6d6d6
| 598194 ||  || — || April 8, 2008 || Mount Lemmon || Mount Lemmon Survey ||  || align=right | 2.3 km || 
|-id=195 bgcolor=#E9E9E9
| 598195 ||  || — || March 15, 2008 || Mount Lemmon || Mount Lemmon Survey ||  || align=right | 1.0 km || 
|-id=196 bgcolor=#d6d6d6
| 598196 ||  || — || April 9, 2008 || Mount Lemmon || Mount Lemmon Survey ||  || align=right | 2.1 km || 
|-id=197 bgcolor=#fefefe
| 598197 ||  || — || March 31, 2008 || Mount Lemmon || Mount Lemmon Survey ||  || align=right data-sort-value="0.58" | 580 m || 
|-id=198 bgcolor=#d6d6d6
| 598198 ||  || — || April 8, 2008 || Kitt Peak || Spacewatch ||  || align=right | 2.6 km || 
|-id=199 bgcolor=#fefefe
| 598199 ||  || — || April 4, 2008 || Kitt Peak || Spacewatch ||  || align=right data-sort-value="0.66" | 660 m || 
|-id=200 bgcolor=#d6d6d6
| 598200 ||  || — || April 8, 2008 || Kitt Peak || Spacewatch ||  || align=right | 2.9 km || 
|}

598201–598300 

|-bgcolor=#d6d6d6
| 598201 ||  || — || April 11, 2008 || Catalina || CSS ||  || align=right | 2.8 km || 
|-id=202 bgcolor=#d6d6d6
| 598202 ||  || — || April 13, 2008 || Mount Lemmon || Mount Lemmon Survey ||  || align=right | 1.9 km || 
|-id=203 bgcolor=#d6d6d6
| 598203 ||  || — || April 1, 2008 || Catalina || CSS ||  || align=right | 3.2 km || 
|-id=204 bgcolor=#d6d6d6
| 598204 ||  || — || April 11, 2008 || Kitt Peak || Spacewatch ||  || align=right | 2.1 km || 
|-id=205 bgcolor=#d6d6d6
| 598205 ||  || — || December 14, 2006 || Mount Lemmon || Mount Lemmon Survey ||  || align=right | 2.6 km || 
|-id=206 bgcolor=#d6d6d6
| 598206 ||  || — || April 11, 2008 || Kitt Peak || Spacewatch ||  || align=right | 2.4 km || 
|-id=207 bgcolor=#E9E9E9
| 598207 ||  || — || April 14, 2008 || Mount Lemmon || Mount Lemmon Survey ||  || align=right | 1.9 km || 
|-id=208 bgcolor=#d6d6d6
| 598208 ||  || — || April 14, 2008 || Mount Lemmon || Mount Lemmon Survey ||  || align=right | 2.5 km || 
|-id=209 bgcolor=#d6d6d6
| 598209 ||  || — || April 3, 2008 || Kitt Peak || Spacewatch ||  || align=right | 2.2 km || 
|-id=210 bgcolor=#d6d6d6
| 598210 ||  || — || April 6, 2008 || Kitt Peak || Spacewatch ||  || align=right | 2.4 km || 
|-id=211 bgcolor=#d6d6d6
| 598211 ||  || — || April 15, 2008 || Mount Lemmon || Mount Lemmon Survey ||  || align=right | 2.6 km || 
|-id=212 bgcolor=#d6d6d6
| 598212 ||  || — || April 11, 2008 || Mount Lemmon || Mount Lemmon Survey ||  || align=right | 2.2 km || 
|-id=213 bgcolor=#d6d6d6
| 598213 ||  || — || April 8, 2008 || Kitt Peak || Spacewatch ||  || align=right | 2.2 km || 
|-id=214 bgcolor=#d6d6d6
| 598214 ||  || — || October 13, 1999 || Apache Point || SDSS Collaboration || EOS || align=right | 1.7 km || 
|-id=215 bgcolor=#d6d6d6
| 598215 ||  || — || April 11, 2008 || Kitt Peak || Spacewatch ||  || align=right | 2.5 km || 
|-id=216 bgcolor=#d6d6d6
| 598216 ||  || — || April 3, 2008 || Kitt Peak || Spacewatch ||  || align=right | 2.5 km || 
|-id=217 bgcolor=#d6d6d6
| 598217 ||  || — || April 3, 2008 || Kitt Peak || Spacewatch ||  || align=right | 2.5 km || 
|-id=218 bgcolor=#fefefe
| 598218 ||  || — || April 11, 2008 || Mount Lemmon || Mount Lemmon Survey ||  || align=right data-sort-value="0.79" | 790 m || 
|-id=219 bgcolor=#E9E9E9
| 598219 ||  || — || April 18, 2012 || Mount Lemmon || Mount Lemmon Survey ||  || align=right data-sort-value="0.74" | 740 m || 
|-id=220 bgcolor=#fefefe
| 598220 ||  || — || October 7, 2013 || Mount Lemmon || Mount Lemmon Survey ||  || align=right data-sort-value="0.73" | 730 m || 
|-id=221 bgcolor=#d6d6d6
| 598221 ||  || — || April 13, 2008 || Mount Lemmon || Mount Lemmon Survey ||  || align=right | 2.3 km || 
|-id=222 bgcolor=#d6d6d6
| 598222 ||  || — || November 18, 2011 || Mount Lemmon || Mount Lemmon Survey ||  || align=right | 1.9 km || 
|-id=223 bgcolor=#fefefe
| 598223 ||  || — || July 18, 2012 || Catalina || CSS ||  || align=right data-sort-value="0.70" | 700 m || 
|-id=224 bgcolor=#d6d6d6
| 598224 ||  || — || April 14, 2008 || Mount Lemmon || Mount Lemmon Survey ||  || align=right | 2.4 km || 
|-id=225 bgcolor=#d6d6d6
| 598225 ||  || — || September 11, 2010 || Mount Lemmon || Mount Lemmon Survey ||  || align=right | 2.7 km || 
|-id=226 bgcolor=#d6d6d6
| 598226 ||  || — || April 6, 2008 || Kitt Peak || Spacewatch ||  || align=right | 2.2 km || 
|-id=227 bgcolor=#d6d6d6
| 598227 ||  || — || March 5, 2013 || Mount Lemmon || Mount Lemmon Survey ||  || align=right | 2.3 km || 
|-id=228 bgcolor=#d6d6d6
| 598228 ||  || — || April 6, 2008 || Kitt Peak || Spacewatch ||  || align=right | 2.7 km || 
|-id=229 bgcolor=#d6d6d6
| 598229 ||  || — || August 21, 2015 || Haleakala || Pan-STARRS ||  || align=right | 2.0 km || 
|-id=230 bgcolor=#fefefe
| 598230 ||  || — || April 8, 2008 || Mount Lemmon || Mount Lemmon Survey ||  || align=right data-sort-value="0.68" | 680 m || 
|-id=231 bgcolor=#d6d6d6
| 598231 ||  || — || April 7, 2008 || Kitt Peak || Spacewatch ||  || align=right | 2.3 km || 
|-id=232 bgcolor=#d6d6d6
| 598232 ||  || — || March 2, 2013 || Mount Lemmon || Mount Lemmon Survey ||  || align=right | 2.3 km || 
|-id=233 bgcolor=#d6d6d6
| 598233 ||  || — || February 14, 2013 || Haleakala || Pan-STARRS ||  || align=right | 2.1 km || 
|-id=234 bgcolor=#d6d6d6
| 598234 ||  || — || April 15, 2008 || Mount Lemmon || Mount Lemmon Survey ||  || align=right | 2.2 km || 
|-id=235 bgcolor=#d6d6d6
| 598235 ||  || — || July 19, 2015 || Haleakala || Pan-STARRS ||  || align=right | 2.1 km || 
|-id=236 bgcolor=#d6d6d6
| 598236 ||  || — || April 4, 2008 || Mount Lemmon || Mount Lemmon Survey ||  || align=right | 2.2 km || 
|-id=237 bgcolor=#d6d6d6
| 598237 ||  || — || August 13, 2015 || Haleakala || Pan-STARRS ||  || align=right | 2.1 km || 
|-id=238 bgcolor=#d6d6d6
| 598238 ||  || — || February 15, 2013 || Haleakala || Pan-STARRS ||  || align=right | 2.1 km || 
|-id=239 bgcolor=#fefefe
| 598239 ||  || — || April 13, 2008 || Kitt Peak || Spacewatch ||  || align=right data-sort-value="0.71" | 710 m || 
|-id=240 bgcolor=#d6d6d6
| 598240 ||  || — || April 14, 2008 || Mount Lemmon || Mount Lemmon Survey ||  || align=right | 2.3 km || 
|-id=241 bgcolor=#d6d6d6
| 598241 ||  || — || April 7, 2008 || Kitt Peak || Spacewatch ||  || align=right | 2.2 km || 
|-id=242 bgcolor=#d6d6d6
| 598242 ||  || — || April 15, 2008 || Mount Lemmon || Mount Lemmon Survey ||  || align=right | 2.2 km || 
|-id=243 bgcolor=#C2FFFF
| 598243 ||  || — || April 6, 2008 || Mount Lemmon || Mount Lemmon Survey || L5 || align=right | 6.8 km || 
|-id=244 bgcolor=#d6d6d6
| 598244 ||  || — || April 12, 2008 || Mount Lemmon || Mount Lemmon Survey ||  || align=right | 2.0 km || 
|-id=245 bgcolor=#d6d6d6
| 598245 ||  || — || April 15, 2008 || Mount Lemmon || Mount Lemmon Survey ||  || align=right | 2.1 km || 
|-id=246 bgcolor=#d6d6d6
| 598246 ||  || — || March 27, 2008 || Mount Lemmon || Mount Lemmon Survey ||  || align=right | 2.7 km || 
|-id=247 bgcolor=#fefefe
| 598247 ||  || — || April 3, 2008 || Mount Lemmon || Mount Lemmon Survey ||  || align=right data-sort-value="0.72" | 720 m || 
|-id=248 bgcolor=#fefefe
| 598248 ||  || — || April 25, 2008 || Kitt Peak || Spacewatch ||  || align=right data-sort-value="0.73" | 730 m || 
|-id=249 bgcolor=#d6d6d6
| 598249 ||  || — || March 31, 2008 || Mount Lemmon || Mount Lemmon Survey ||  || align=right | 2.0 km || 
|-id=250 bgcolor=#d6d6d6
| 598250 ||  || — || April 3, 2008 || Kitt Peak || Spacewatch ||  || align=right | 2.4 km || 
|-id=251 bgcolor=#fefefe
| 598251 ||  || — || February 22, 2004 || Kitt Peak || M. W. Buie ||  || align=right data-sort-value="0.73" | 730 m || 
|-id=252 bgcolor=#d6d6d6
| 598252 ||  || — || April 26, 2008 || Kitt Peak || Spacewatch ||  || align=right | 1.9 km || 
|-id=253 bgcolor=#d6d6d6
| 598253 ||  || — || March 10, 2002 || Kitt Peak || Spacewatch ||  || align=right | 2.5 km || 
|-id=254 bgcolor=#d6d6d6
| 598254 ||  || — || April 27, 2008 || Kitt Peak || Spacewatch ||  || align=right | 2.2 km || 
|-id=255 bgcolor=#fefefe
| 598255 ||  || — || September 28, 2006 || Catalina || CSS || H || align=right data-sort-value="0.57" | 570 m || 
|-id=256 bgcolor=#d6d6d6
| 598256 ||  || — || April 6, 2008 || Mount Lemmon || Mount Lemmon Survey ||  || align=right | 1.9 km || 
|-id=257 bgcolor=#d6d6d6
| 598257 ||  || — || April 1, 2008 || Mount Lemmon || Mount Lemmon Survey ||  || align=right | 2.0 km || 
|-id=258 bgcolor=#d6d6d6
| 598258 ||  || — || April 6, 2008 || Kitt Peak || Spacewatch ||  || align=right | 2.4 km || 
|-id=259 bgcolor=#d6d6d6
| 598259 ||  || — || April 30, 2008 || Kitt Peak || Spacewatch ||  || align=right | 2.9 km || 
|-id=260 bgcolor=#fefefe
| 598260 ||  || — || April 29, 2008 || Kitt Peak || Spacewatch ||  || align=right data-sort-value="0.56" | 560 m || 
|-id=261 bgcolor=#d6d6d6
| 598261 ||  || — || April 29, 2008 || Kitt Peak || Spacewatch ||  || align=right | 2.5 km || 
|-id=262 bgcolor=#d6d6d6
| 598262 ||  || — || April 1, 2008 || Mount Lemmon || Mount Lemmon Survey ||  || align=right | 2.4 km || 
|-id=263 bgcolor=#d6d6d6
| 598263 ||  || — || April 3, 2008 || Catalina || CSS || Tj (2.99) || align=right | 3.4 km || 
|-id=264 bgcolor=#d6d6d6
| 598264 ||  || — || April 29, 2008 || Mount Lemmon || Mount Lemmon Survey ||  || align=right | 2.4 km || 
|-id=265 bgcolor=#d6d6d6
| 598265 ||  || — || April 29, 2008 || Mount Lemmon || Mount Lemmon Survey ||  || align=right | 2.2 km || 
|-id=266 bgcolor=#FA8072
| 598266 ||  || — || November 7, 2007 || Mount Lemmon || Mount Lemmon Survey ||  || align=right data-sort-value="0.87" | 870 m || 
|-id=267 bgcolor=#fefefe
| 598267 ||  || — || March 30, 2004 || Kitt Peak || Spacewatch || MAS || align=right data-sort-value="0.66" | 660 m || 
|-id=268 bgcolor=#fefefe
| 598268 ||  || — || April 25, 2008 || Kitt Peak || Spacewatch ||  || align=right data-sort-value="0.76" | 760 m || 
|-id=269 bgcolor=#d6d6d6
| 598269 ||  || — || October 23, 2011 || Haleakala || Pan-STARRS ||  || align=right | 2.2 km || 
|-id=270 bgcolor=#E9E9E9
| 598270 ||  || — || October 30, 2010 || Mount Lemmon || Mount Lemmon Survey ||  || align=right data-sort-value="0.88" | 880 m || 
|-id=271 bgcolor=#d6d6d6
| 598271 ||  || — || April 29, 2008 || Mount Lemmon || Mount Lemmon Survey ||  || align=right | 2.8 km || 
|-id=272 bgcolor=#d6d6d6
| 598272 ||  || — || November 3, 2012 || Haleakala || Pan-STARRS ||  || align=right | 2.9 km || 
|-id=273 bgcolor=#C2FFFF
| 598273 ||  || — || September 21, 2012 || Mount Lemmon || Mount Lemmon Survey || L5 || align=right | 6.2 km || 
|-id=274 bgcolor=#d6d6d6
| 598274 ||  || — || April 27, 2008 || Kitt Peak || Spacewatch ||  || align=right | 2.6 km || 
|-id=275 bgcolor=#d6d6d6
| 598275 ||  || — || April 29, 2008 || Kitt Peak || Spacewatch ||  || align=right | 2.4 km || 
|-id=276 bgcolor=#d6d6d6
| 598276 ||  || — || April 27, 2008 || Kitt Peak || Spacewatch ||  || align=right | 2.1 km || 
|-id=277 bgcolor=#d6d6d6
| 598277 ||  || — || April 29, 2008 || Kitt Peak || Spacewatch ||  || align=right | 2.2 km || 
|-id=278 bgcolor=#fefefe
| 598278 ||  || — || July 29, 2005 || Anderson Mesa || LONEOS ||  || align=right data-sort-value="0.80" | 800 m || 
|-id=279 bgcolor=#d6d6d6
| 598279 ||  || — || April 1, 2008 || Mount Lemmon || Mount Lemmon Survey ||  || align=right | 2.2 km || 
|-id=280 bgcolor=#d6d6d6
| 598280 ||  || — || May 3, 2008 || Kitt Peak || Spacewatch ||  || align=right | 2.2 km || 
|-id=281 bgcolor=#d6d6d6
| 598281 ||  || — || May 3, 2008 || Kitt Peak || Spacewatch ||  || align=right | 1.9 km || 
|-id=282 bgcolor=#fefefe
| 598282 ||  || — || March 29, 2008 || Mount Lemmon || Mount Lemmon Survey ||  || align=right data-sort-value="0.39" | 390 m || 
|-id=283 bgcolor=#d6d6d6
| 598283 ||  || — || May 3, 2008 || Mount Lemmon || Mount Lemmon Survey ||  || align=right | 2.3 km || 
|-id=284 bgcolor=#fefefe
| 598284 ||  || — || September 28, 2006 || Kitt Peak || Spacewatch || H || align=right data-sort-value="0.57" | 570 m || 
|-id=285 bgcolor=#fefefe
| 598285 ||  || — || May 7, 2008 || Mount Lemmon || Mount Lemmon Survey ||  || align=right | 1.00 km || 
|-id=286 bgcolor=#fefefe
| 598286 ||  || — || March 29, 2008 || Kitt Peak || Spacewatch ||  || align=right data-sort-value="0.80" | 800 m || 
|-id=287 bgcolor=#fefefe
| 598287 ||  || — || October 1, 2005 || Catalina || CSS ||  || align=right data-sort-value="0.99" | 990 m || 
|-id=288 bgcolor=#d6d6d6
| 598288 ||  || — || May 11, 2008 || Mount Lemmon || Mount Lemmon Survey ||  || align=right | 3.6 km || 
|-id=289 bgcolor=#d6d6d6
| 598289 ||  || — || May 3, 2008 || Mount Lemmon || Mount Lemmon Survey ||  || align=right | 2.3 km || 
|-id=290 bgcolor=#d6d6d6
| 598290 ||  || — || January 26, 2012 || Haleakala || Pan-STARRS ||  || align=right | 2.3 km || 
|-id=291 bgcolor=#fefefe
| 598291 ||  || — || November 9, 2009 || Mount Lemmon || Mount Lemmon Survey || H || align=right data-sort-value="0.77" | 770 m || 
|-id=292 bgcolor=#d6d6d6
| 598292 ||  || — || May 6, 2008 || Mount Lemmon || Mount Lemmon Survey ||  || align=right | 2.5 km || 
|-id=293 bgcolor=#fefefe
| 598293 ||  || — || May 3, 2008 || Mount Lemmon || Mount Lemmon Survey ||  || align=right data-sort-value="0.65" | 650 m || 
|-id=294 bgcolor=#d6d6d6
| 598294 ||  || — || November 10, 2010 || Mount Lemmon || Mount Lemmon Survey ||  || align=right | 2.5 km || 
|-id=295 bgcolor=#d6d6d6
| 598295 ||  || — || May 14, 2008 || Mount Lemmon || Mount Lemmon Survey ||  || align=right | 2.3 km || 
|-id=296 bgcolor=#d6d6d6
| 598296 ||  || — || May 7, 2008 || Kitt Peak || Spacewatch ||  || align=right | 2.5 km || 
|-id=297 bgcolor=#d6d6d6
| 598297 ||  || — || August 12, 2015 || Haleakala || Pan-STARRS ||  || align=right | 2.3 km || 
|-id=298 bgcolor=#d6d6d6
| 598298 ||  || — || October 19, 2015 || Haleakala || Pan-STARRS ||  || align=right | 2.4 km || 
|-id=299 bgcolor=#d6d6d6
| 598299 ||  || — || May 14, 2008 || Mount Lemmon || Mount Lemmon Survey ||  || align=right | 2.6 km || 
|-id=300 bgcolor=#d6d6d6
| 598300 ||  || — || May 11, 2008 || Kitt Peak || Spacewatch ||  || align=right | 1.9 km || 
|}

598301–598400 

|-bgcolor=#d6d6d6
| 598301 ||  || — || May 7, 2008 || Mount Lemmon || Mount Lemmon Survey ||  || align=right | 3.2 km || 
|-id=302 bgcolor=#d6d6d6
| 598302 ||  || — || May 3, 2008 || Mount Lemmon || Mount Lemmon Survey ||  || align=right | 2.5 km || 
|-id=303 bgcolor=#d6d6d6
| 598303 ||  || — || May 27, 2008 || Kitt Peak || Spacewatch || Tj (2.99) || align=right | 3.0 km || 
|-id=304 bgcolor=#d6d6d6
| 598304 ||  || — || April 30, 2008 || Mount Lemmon || Mount Lemmon Survey ||  || align=right | 2.5 km || 
|-id=305 bgcolor=#FA8072
| 598305 ||  || — || May 7, 2008 || Mount Lemmon || Mount Lemmon Survey ||  || align=right data-sort-value="0.78" | 780 m || 
|-id=306 bgcolor=#d6d6d6
| 598306 ||  || — || May 14, 2008 || Mount Lemmon || Mount Lemmon Survey ||  || align=right | 2.5 km || 
|-id=307 bgcolor=#fefefe
| 598307 ||  || — || April 29, 2008 || Kitt Peak || Spacewatch ||  || align=right data-sort-value="0.57" | 570 m || 
|-id=308 bgcolor=#d6d6d6
| 598308 ||  || — || May 14, 2008 || Kitt Peak || Spacewatch ||  || align=right | 2.5 km || 
|-id=309 bgcolor=#d6d6d6
| 598309 ||  || — || May 3, 2008 || Kitt Peak || Spacewatch ||  || align=right | 1.7 km || 
|-id=310 bgcolor=#d6d6d6
| 598310 ||  || — || May 27, 2008 || Kitt Peak || Spacewatch ||  || align=right | 1.7 km || 
|-id=311 bgcolor=#d6d6d6
| 598311 ||  || — || February 23, 2007 || Kitt Peak || Spacewatch ||  || align=right | 2.2 km || 
|-id=312 bgcolor=#d6d6d6
| 598312 ||  || — || May 27, 2008 || Kitt Peak || Spacewatch ||  || align=right | 2.1 km || 
|-id=313 bgcolor=#d6d6d6
| 598313 ||  || — || May 29, 2008 || Mount Lemmon || Mount Lemmon Survey ||  || align=right | 2.2 km || 
|-id=314 bgcolor=#C2FFFF
| 598314 ||  || — || April 8, 2008 || Kitt Peak || Spacewatch || L5 || align=right | 6.4 km || 
|-id=315 bgcolor=#E9E9E9
| 598315 ||  || — || April 26, 2008 || Kitt Peak || Spacewatch ||  || align=right data-sort-value="0.63" | 630 m || 
|-id=316 bgcolor=#d6d6d6
| 598316 ||  || — || May 31, 2008 || Kitt Peak || Spacewatch ||  || align=right | 2.5 km || 
|-id=317 bgcolor=#fefefe
| 598317 ||  || — || May 29, 2008 || Mount Lemmon || Mount Lemmon Survey ||  || align=right data-sort-value="0.78" | 780 m || 
|-id=318 bgcolor=#d6d6d6
| 598318 ||  || — || May 29, 2008 || Kitt Peak || Spacewatch ||  || align=right | 1.8 km || 
|-id=319 bgcolor=#d6d6d6
| 598319 ||  || — || April 30, 2008 || Mount Lemmon || Mount Lemmon Survey ||  || align=right | 2.7 km || 
|-id=320 bgcolor=#d6d6d6
| 598320 ||  || — || May 30, 2008 || Mount Lemmon || Mount Lemmon Survey ||  || align=right | 2.3 km || 
|-id=321 bgcolor=#E9E9E9
| 598321 ||  || — || April 16, 2016 || Haleakala || Pan-STARRS ||  || align=right data-sort-value="0.99" | 990 m || 
|-id=322 bgcolor=#d6d6d6
| 598322 ||  || — || May 28, 2008 || Kitt Peak || Spacewatch ||  || align=right | 2.2 km || 
|-id=323 bgcolor=#fefefe
| 598323 ||  || — || May 31, 2008 || Mount Lemmon || Mount Lemmon Survey ||  || align=right data-sort-value="0.89" | 890 m || 
|-id=324 bgcolor=#E9E9E9
| 598324 ||  || — || April 4, 2016 || Mount Lemmon || Mount Lemmon Survey ||  || align=right data-sort-value="0.77" | 770 m || 
|-id=325 bgcolor=#d6d6d6
| 598325 ||  || — || January 27, 2012 || Mount Lemmon || Mount Lemmon Survey ||  || align=right | 2.4 km || 
|-id=326 bgcolor=#fefefe
| 598326 ||  || — || October 12, 2017 || Mount Lemmon || Mount Lemmon Survey || H || align=right data-sort-value="0.63" | 630 m || 
|-id=327 bgcolor=#d6d6d6
| 598327 ||  || — || May 29, 2008 || Kitt Peak || Spacewatch ||  || align=right | 2.2 km || 
|-id=328 bgcolor=#d6d6d6
| 598328 ||  || — || June 1, 2008 || Mount Lemmon || Mount Lemmon Survey ||  || align=right | 2.3 km || 
|-id=329 bgcolor=#fefefe
| 598329 ||  || — || March 10, 2008 || Kitt Peak || Spacewatch ||  || align=right data-sort-value="0.68" | 680 m || 
|-id=330 bgcolor=#d6d6d6
| 598330 ||  || — || April 13, 2008 || Mount Lemmon || Mount Lemmon Survey || EUP || align=right | 2.9 km || 
|-id=331 bgcolor=#fefefe
| 598331 ||  || — || June 2, 2008 || Mount Lemmon || Mount Lemmon Survey ||  || align=right data-sort-value="0.67" | 670 m || 
|-id=332 bgcolor=#d6d6d6
| 598332 ||  || — || May 27, 2008 || Kitt Peak || Spacewatch ||  || align=right | 2.2 km || 
|-id=333 bgcolor=#fefefe
| 598333 ||  || — || May 28, 2008 || Mount Lemmon || Mount Lemmon Survey ||  || align=right data-sort-value="0.62" | 620 m || 
|-id=334 bgcolor=#d6d6d6
| 598334 ||  || — || June 7, 2008 || Cerro Burek || Alianza S4 Obs. ||  || align=right | 3.9 km || 
|-id=335 bgcolor=#d6d6d6
| 598335 ||  || — || October 15, 2009 || Mount Lemmon || Mount Lemmon Survey ||  || align=right | 2.4 km || 
|-id=336 bgcolor=#fefefe
| 598336 ||  || — || June 22, 2012 || Kitt Peak || Spacewatch ||  || align=right data-sort-value="0.67" | 670 m || 
|-id=337 bgcolor=#d6d6d6
| 598337 ||  || — || June 6, 2008 || Kitt Peak || Spacewatch ||  || align=right | 2.5 km || 
|-id=338 bgcolor=#d6d6d6
| 598338 ||  || — || September 12, 2015 || Haleakala || Pan-STARRS ||  || align=right | 2.1 km || 
|-id=339 bgcolor=#E9E9E9
| 598339 ||  || — || June 30, 2008 || Kitt Peak || Spacewatch ||  || align=right | 1.2 km || 
|-id=340 bgcolor=#E9E9E9
| 598340 ||  || — || February 10, 2011 || Mount Lemmon || Mount Lemmon Survey ||  || align=right data-sort-value="0.81" | 810 m || 
|-id=341 bgcolor=#E9E9E9
| 598341 ||  || — || July 4, 2008 || Wildberg || R. Apitzsch ||  || align=right | 1.1 km || 
|-id=342 bgcolor=#d6d6d6
| 598342 ||  || — || July 8, 2008 || Mount Lemmon || Mount Lemmon Survey ||  || align=right | 2.8 km || 
|-id=343 bgcolor=#d6d6d6
| 598343 ||  || — || July 2, 2008 || Kitt Peak || Spacewatch ||  || align=right | 2.8 km || 
|-id=344 bgcolor=#d6d6d6
| 598344 ||  || — || September 26, 2003 || Apache Point || SDSS Collaboration ||  || align=right | 3.1 km || 
|-id=345 bgcolor=#d6d6d6
| 598345 ||  || — || July 28, 2008 || La Sagra || OAM Obs. ||  || align=right | 3.0 km || 
|-id=346 bgcolor=#fefefe
| 598346 ||  || — || July 30, 2008 || Catalina || CSS ||  || align=right data-sort-value="0.73" | 730 m || 
|-id=347 bgcolor=#fefefe
| 598347 ||  || — || September 21, 2012 || Mount Lemmon || Mount Lemmon Survey ||  || align=right data-sort-value="0.89" | 890 m || 
|-id=348 bgcolor=#C2FFFF
| 598348 ||  || — || July 29, 2008 || Kitt Peak || Spacewatch || L4 || align=right | 5.6 km || 
|-id=349 bgcolor=#C2FFFF
| 598349 ||  || — || July 30, 2008 || Kitt Peak || Spacewatch || L4 || align=right | 6.4 km || 
|-id=350 bgcolor=#d6d6d6
| 598350 ||  || — || July 29, 2008 || Mount Lemmon || Mount Lemmon Survey ||  || align=right | 2.2 km || 
|-id=351 bgcolor=#E9E9E9
| 598351 ||  || — || August 3, 2008 || Pla D'Arguines || R. Ferrando, M. Ferrando ||  || align=right | 1.3 km || 
|-id=352 bgcolor=#d6d6d6
| 598352 ||  || — || August 4, 2008 || La Sagra || OAM Obs. || 7:4 || align=right | 3.5 km || 
|-id=353 bgcolor=#fefefe
| 598353 ||  || — || August 10, 2008 || La Sagra || OAM Obs. ||  || align=right data-sort-value="0.86" | 860 m || 
|-id=354 bgcolor=#E9E9E9
| 598354 ||  || — || August 2, 2008 || Siding Spring || SSS ||  || align=right | 1.0 km || 
|-id=355 bgcolor=#fefefe
| 598355 ||  || — || August 12, 2008 || Crni Vrh || S. Matičič || H || align=right data-sort-value="0.57" | 570 m || 
|-id=356 bgcolor=#C2FFFF
| 598356 ||  || — || August 7, 2008 || Kitt Peak || Spacewatch || L4 || align=right | 6.1 km || 
|-id=357 bgcolor=#fefefe
| 598357 ||  || — || July 30, 2008 || Kitt Peak || Spacewatch ||  || align=right data-sort-value="0.82" | 820 m || 
|-id=358 bgcolor=#d6d6d6
| 598358 ||  || — || August 26, 2008 || La Sagra || OAM Obs. ||  || align=right | 2.5 km || 
|-id=359 bgcolor=#fefefe
| 598359 ||  || — || August 2, 2008 || La Sagra || OAM Obs. ||  || align=right data-sort-value="0.85" | 850 m || 
|-id=360 bgcolor=#fefefe
| 598360 ||  || — || August 26, 2008 || La Sagra || OAM Obs. ||  || align=right data-sort-value="0.55" | 550 m || 
|-id=361 bgcolor=#C2FFFF
| 598361 ||  || — || August 29, 2008 || Lulin || LUSS || L4 || align=right | 5.9 km || 
|-id=362 bgcolor=#d6d6d6
| 598362 ||  || — || August 27, 2008 || Pises || C. Demeautis, J.-M. Lopez ||  || align=right | 2.3 km || 
|-id=363 bgcolor=#E9E9E9
| 598363 ||  || — || August 27, 2008 || Crni Vrh || B. Mikuž ||  || align=right | 2.9 km || 
|-id=364 bgcolor=#fefefe
| 598364 ||  || — || August 20, 2008 || Kitt Peak || Spacewatch ||  || align=right data-sort-value="0.61" | 610 m || 
|-id=365 bgcolor=#d6d6d6
| 598365 ||  || — || August 25, 2008 || Crni Vrh || S. Matičič ||  || align=right | 2.3 km || 
|-id=366 bgcolor=#E9E9E9
| 598366 ||  || — || August 24, 2008 || Kitt Peak || Spacewatch ||  || align=right data-sort-value="0.95" | 950 m || 
|-id=367 bgcolor=#d6d6d6
| 598367 ||  || — || August 24, 2008 || Crni Vrh || J. Skvarč ||  || align=right | 2.3 km || 
|-id=368 bgcolor=#C2FFFF
| 598368 ||  || — || September 5, 1996 || Kitt Peak || Spacewatch || L4 || align=right | 9.8 km || 
|-id=369 bgcolor=#E9E9E9
| 598369 ||  || — || August 24, 2008 || Kitt Peak || Spacewatch ||  || align=right | 1.8 km || 
|-id=370 bgcolor=#C2FFFF
| 598370 ||  || — || August 24, 2008 || Kitt Peak || Spacewatch || L4 || align=right | 7.8 km || 
|-id=371 bgcolor=#E9E9E9
| 598371 ||  || — || September 21, 2004 || Kitt Peak || Spacewatch ||  || align=right data-sort-value="0.77" | 770 m || 
|-id=372 bgcolor=#E9E9E9
| 598372 ||  || — || September 4, 2008 || Kitt Peak || Spacewatch ||  || align=right | 2.5 km || 
|-id=373 bgcolor=#E9E9E9
| 598373 ||  || — || August 24, 2008 || Kitt Peak || Spacewatch ||  || align=right | 1.3 km || 
|-id=374 bgcolor=#E9E9E9
| 598374 ||  || — || September 2, 2008 || Kitt Peak || Spacewatch ||  || align=right | 1.0 km || 
|-id=375 bgcolor=#C2FFFF
| 598375 ||  || — || September 2, 2008 || Kitt Peak || Spacewatch || L4 || align=right | 6.2 km || 
|-id=376 bgcolor=#d6d6d6
| 598376 ||  || — || September 3, 2008 || Kitt Peak || Spacewatch ||  || align=right | 2.6 km || 
|-id=377 bgcolor=#E9E9E9
| 598377 ||  || — || September 3, 2008 || Kitt Peak || Spacewatch ||  || align=right | 1.2 km || 
|-id=378 bgcolor=#d6d6d6
| 598378 ||  || — || September 4, 2008 || Kitt Peak || Spacewatch ||  || align=right | 2.1 km || 
|-id=379 bgcolor=#C2FFFF
| 598379 ||  || — || September 4, 2008 || Kitt Peak || Spacewatch || L4 || align=right | 8.3 km || 
|-id=380 bgcolor=#fefefe
| 598380 ||  || — || September 6, 2008 || Mount Lemmon || Mount Lemmon Survey ||  || align=right data-sort-value="0.45" | 450 m || 
|-id=381 bgcolor=#E9E9E9
| 598381 ||  || — || September 2, 2008 || Sandlot || G. Hug ||  || align=right | 1.2 km || 
|-id=382 bgcolor=#E9E9E9
| 598382 ||  || — || September 4, 2008 || Kitt Peak || Spacewatch ||  || align=right data-sort-value="0.85" | 850 m || 
|-id=383 bgcolor=#E9E9E9
| 598383 ||  || — || September 4, 2008 || Kitt Peak || Spacewatch ||  || align=right data-sort-value="0.94" | 940 m || 
|-id=384 bgcolor=#E9E9E9
| 598384 ||  || — || September 6, 2008 || Kitt Peak || Spacewatch ||  || align=right | 1.6 km || 
|-id=385 bgcolor=#C2FFFF
| 598385 ||  || — || September 7, 2008 || Mount Lemmon || Mount Lemmon Survey || L4 || align=right | 6.8 km || 
|-id=386 bgcolor=#C2FFFF
| 598386 ||  || — || September 2, 2008 || Kitt Peak || Spacewatch || L4 || align=right | 6.8 km || 
|-id=387 bgcolor=#C2FFFF
| 598387 ||  || — || September 4, 2008 || Kitt Peak || Spacewatch || L4 || align=right | 6.0 km || 
|-id=388 bgcolor=#E9E9E9
| 598388 ||  || — || September 6, 2008 || Mount Lemmon || Mount Lemmon Survey ||  || align=right | 1.4 km || 
|-id=389 bgcolor=#fefefe
| 598389 ||  || — || September 7, 2008 || Mount Lemmon || Mount Lemmon Survey ||  || align=right data-sort-value="0.73" | 730 m || 
|-id=390 bgcolor=#E9E9E9
| 598390 ||  || — || September 6, 2008 || Kitt Peak || Spacewatch ||  || align=right data-sort-value="0.95" | 950 m || 
|-id=391 bgcolor=#E9E9E9
| 598391 ||  || — || September 2, 2008 || Kitt Peak || Spacewatch ||  || align=right | 1.2 km || 
|-id=392 bgcolor=#fefefe
| 598392 ||  || — || September 7, 2008 || Catalina || CSS ||  || align=right | 1.1 km || 
|-id=393 bgcolor=#C2FFFF
| 598393 ||  || — || September 4, 2008 || Kitt Peak || Spacewatch || L4 || align=right | 8.4 km || 
|-id=394 bgcolor=#d6d6d6
| 598394 ||  || — || February 23, 2012 || Kitt Peak || Spacewatch ||  || align=right | 2.2 km || 
|-id=395 bgcolor=#E9E9E9
| 598395 ||  || — || August 1, 2016 || Haleakala || Pan-STARRS ||  || align=right data-sort-value="0.82" | 820 m || 
|-id=396 bgcolor=#C2FFFF
| 598396 ||  || — || September 7, 2008 || Mount Lemmon || Mount Lemmon Survey || L4 || align=right | 7.0 km || 
|-id=397 bgcolor=#fefefe
| 598397 ||  || — || September 6, 2008 || Mount Lemmon || Mount Lemmon Survey ||  || align=right data-sort-value="0.51" | 510 m || 
|-id=398 bgcolor=#C2FFFF
| 598398 ||  || — || October 18, 2009 || Mount Lemmon || Mount Lemmon Survey || L4 || align=right | 6.6 km || 
|-id=399 bgcolor=#C2FFFF
| 598399 ||  || — || September 6, 2008 || Mount Lemmon || Mount Lemmon Survey || L4 || align=right | 5.7 km || 
|-id=400 bgcolor=#C2FFFF
| 598400 ||  || — || September 6, 2008 || Kitt Peak || Spacewatch || L4 || align=right | 7.0 km || 
|}

598401–598500 

|-bgcolor=#C2FFFF
| 598401 ||  || — || September 5, 2008 || Kitt Peak || Spacewatch || L4 || align=right | 7.0 km || 
|-id=402 bgcolor=#C2FFFF
| 598402 ||  || — || September 4, 2008 || Kitt Peak || Spacewatch || L4 || align=right | 6.8 km || 
|-id=403 bgcolor=#E9E9E9
| 598403 ||  || — || September 3, 2008 || Kitt Peak || Spacewatch ||  || align=right | 1.0 km || 
|-id=404 bgcolor=#C2FFFF
| 598404 ||  || — || September 6, 2008 || Mount Lemmon || Mount Lemmon Survey || L4 || align=right | 7.5 km || 
|-id=405 bgcolor=#C2FFFF
| 598405 ||  || — || September 6, 2008 || Kitt Peak || Spacewatch || L4 || align=right | 6.7 km || 
|-id=406 bgcolor=#C2FFFF
| 598406 ||  || — || September 3, 2008 || Kitt Peak || Spacewatch || L4 || align=right | 6.2 km || 
|-id=407 bgcolor=#C2FFFF
| 598407 ||  || — || September 2, 2008 || Kitt Peak || Spacewatch || L4 || align=right | 6.0 km || 
|-id=408 bgcolor=#E9E9E9
| 598408 ||  || — || September 7, 2008 || Mount Lemmon || Mount Lemmon Survey ||  || align=right data-sort-value="0.92" | 920 m || 
|-id=409 bgcolor=#d6d6d6
| 598409 ||  || — || August 21, 2008 || Kitt Peak || Spacewatch ||  || align=right | 2.4 km || 
|-id=410 bgcolor=#d6d6d6
| 598410 ||  || — || July 30, 2008 || Kitt Peak || Spacewatch ||  || align=right | 1.9 km || 
|-id=411 bgcolor=#C2FFFF
| 598411 ||  || — || September 20, 2008 || Kitt Peak || Spacewatch || L4 || align=right | 7.1 km || 
|-id=412 bgcolor=#fefefe
| 598412 ||  || — || September 20, 2008 || Catalina || CSS ||  || align=right | 1.0 km || 
|-id=413 bgcolor=#E9E9E9
| 598413 ||  || — || September 20, 2008 || Mount Lemmon || Mount Lemmon Survey ||  || align=right | 1.6 km || 
|-id=414 bgcolor=#E9E9E9
| 598414 ||  || — || August 24, 2008 || Kitt Peak || Spacewatch ||  || align=right | 1.2 km || 
|-id=415 bgcolor=#E9E9E9
| 598415 ||  || — || September 5, 2008 || Kitt Peak || Spacewatch ||  || align=right data-sort-value="0.92" | 920 m || 
|-id=416 bgcolor=#E9E9E9
| 598416 ||  || — || April 18, 2007 || Mount Lemmon || Mount Lemmon Survey ||  || align=right | 1.1 km || 
|-id=417 bgcolor=#E9E9E9
| 598417 ||  || — || September 7, 2008 || Mount Lemmon || Mount Lemmon Survey ||  || align=right data-sort-value="0.69" | 690 m || 
|-id=418 bgcolor=#C2FFFF
| 598418 ||  || — || September 22, 2008 || Mount Lemmon || Mount Lemmon Survey || L4 || align=right | 8.1 km || 
|-id=419 bgcolor=#d6d6d6
| 598419 ||  || — || September 22, 2008 || Mount Lemmon || Mount Lemmon Survey || 7:4 || align=right | 2.6 km || 
|-id=420 bgcolor=#E9E9E9
| 598420 ||  || — || May 10, 2003 || Kitt Peak || Spacewatch ||  || align=right | 1.1 km || 
|-id=421 bgcolor=#d6d6d6
| 598421 ||  || — || September 25, 2008 || Kitt Peak || Spacewatch || 7:4 || align=right | 2.9 km || 
|-id=422 bgcolor=#E9E9E9
| 598422 ||  || — || September 25, 2008 || Kitt Peak || Spacewatch ||  || align=right data-sort-value="0.69" | 690 m || 
|-id=423 bgcolor=#d6d6d6
| 598423 ||  || — || September 26, 2008 || Kitt Peak || Spacewatch ||  || align=right | 2.5 km || 
|-id=424 bgcolor=#E9E9E9
| 598424 ||  || — || September 26, 2008 || Kitt Peak || Spacewatch ||  || align=right | 1.2 km || 
|-id=425 bgcolor=#E9E9E9
| 598425 ||  || — || September 29, 2008 || Mount Lemmon || Mount Lemmon Survey ||  || align=right | 1.0 km || 
|-id=426 bgcolor=#C2FFFF
| 598426 ||  || — || September 2, 2008 || Kitt Peak || Spacewatch || L4 || align=right | 4.8 km || 
|-id=427 bgcolor=#C2FFFF
| 598427 ||  || — || September 2, 2008 || Kitt Peak || Spacewatch || L4 || align=right | 5.7 km || 
|-id=428 bgcolor=#C2FFFF
| 598428 ||  || — || September 29, 2008 || Mount Lemmon || Mount Lemmon Survey || L4 || align=right | 6.3 km || 
|-id=429 bgcolor=#E9E9E9
| 598429 ||  || — || September 21, 2008 || Kitt Peak || Spacewatch ||  || align=right | 1.9 km || 
|-id=430 bgcolor=#E9E9E9
| 598430 ||  || — || September 3, 2008 || Kitt Peak || Spacewatch ||  || align=right | 1.3 km || 
|-id=431 bgcolor=#C2FFFF
| 598431 ||  || — || September 29, 2008 || Mount Lemmon || Mount Lemmon Survey || L4 || align=right | 7.0 km || 
|-id=432 bgcolor=#E9E9E9
| 598432 ||  || — || September 24, 2008 || Kitt Peak || Spacewatch ||  || align=right | 1.1 km || 
|-id=433 bgcolor=#C2FFFF
| 598433 ||  || — || September 20, 2008 || Mount Lemmon || Mount Lemmon Survey || L4 || align=right | 6.6 km || 
|-id=434 bgcolor=#C2FFFF
| 598434 ||  || — || September 4, 2008 || Kitt Peak || Spacewatch || L4 || align=right | 8.9 km || 
|-id=435 bgcolor=#C2FFFF
| 598435 ||  || — || September 24, 2008 || Kitt Peak || Spacewatch || L4 || align=right | 7.3 km || 
|-id=436 bgcolor=#C2FFFF
| 598436 ||  || — || September 24, 2008 || Mount Lemmon || Mount Lemmon Survey || L4 || align=right | 7.4 km || 
|-id=437 bgcolor=#C2FFFF
| 598437 ||  || — || September 24, 2008 || Mount Lemmon || Mount Lemmon Survey || L4 || align=right | 7.1 km || 
|-id=438 bgcolor=#d6d6d6
| 598438 ||  || — || September 24, 2008 || Kitt Peak || Spacewatch ||  || align=right | 2.3 km || 
|-id=439 bgcolor=#E9E9E9
| 598439 ||  || — || September 28, 2008 || Mount Lemmon || Mount Lemmon Survey ||  || align=right | 1.6 km || 
|-id=440 bgcolor=#C2FFFF
| 598440 ||  || — || December 12, 2012 || Kitt Peak || Spacewatch || L4 || align=right | 9.7 km || 
|-id=441 bgcolor=#E9E9E9
| 598441 ||  || — || September 23, 2008 || Mount Lemmon || Mount Lemmon Survey ||  || align=right data-sort-value="0.80" | 800 m || 
|-id=442 bgcolor=#E9E9E9
| 598442 ||  || — || October 6, 2012 || Mount Lemmon || Mount Lemmon Survey ||  || align=right data-sort-value="0.78" | 780 m || 
|-id=443 bgcolor=#E9E9E9
| 598443 ||  || — || September 24, 2008 || Kitt Peak || Spacewatch ||  || align=right | 1.3 km || 
|-id=444 bgcolor=#E9E9E9
| 598444 ||  || — || September 24, 2008 || Kitt Peak || Spacewatch ||  || align=right | 1.2 km || 
|-id=445 bgcolor=#E9E9E9
| 598445 ||  || — || September 6, 2008 || Kitt Peak || Spacewatch ||  || align=right data-sort-value="0.78" | 780 m || 
|-id=446 bgcolor=#E9E9E9
| 598446 ||  || — || September 22, 2008 || Catalina || CSS ||  || align=right data-sort-value="0.91" | 910 m || 
|-id=447 bgcolor=#C2FFFF
| 598447 ||  || — || September 28, 2009 || Kitt Peak || Spacewatch || L4 || align=right | 6.4 km || 
|-id=448 bgcolor=#C2FFFF
| 598448 ||  || — || September 24, 2008 || Kitt Peak || Spacewatch || L4 || align=right | 6.8 km || 
|-id=449 bgcolor=#E9E9E9
| 598449 ||  || — || April 6, 2002 || Cerro Tololo || Cerro Tololo Obs. ||  || align=right data-sort-value="0.76" | 760 m || 
|-id=450 bgcolor=#C2FFFF
| 598450 ||  || — || October 27, 2009 || Mount Lemmon || Mount Lemmon Survey || L4 || align=right | 6.4 km || 
|-id=451 bgcolor=#d6d6d6
| 598451 ||  || — || July 14, 2013 || Haleakala || Pan-STARRS ||  || align=right | 2.0 km || 
|-id=452 bgcolor=#C2FFFF
| 598452 ||  || — || September 23, 2008 || Mount Lemmon || Mount Lemmon Survey || L4 || align=right | 6.3 km || 
|-id=453 bgcolor=#fefefe
| 598453 ||  || — || September 21, 2008 || Kitt Peak || Spacewatch ||  || align=right data-sort-value="0.67" | 670 m || 
|-id=454 bgcolor=#E9E9E9
| 598454 ||  || — || September 29, 2008 || Mount Lemmon || Mount Lemmon Survey ||  || align=right | 1.1 km || 
|-id=455 bgcolor=#d6d6d6
| 598455 ||  || — || September 20, 2008 || Mount Lemmon || Mount Lemmon Survey ||  || align=right | 2.6 km || 
|-id=456 bgcolor=#C2FFFF
| 598456 ||  || — || September 23, 2008 || Kitt Peak || Spacewatch || L4 || align=right | 6.2 km || 
|-id=457 bgcolor=#E9E9E9
| 598457 ||  || — || September 27, 2008 || Mount Lemmon || Mount Lemmon Survey ||  || align=right data-sort-value="0.72" | 720 m || 
|-id=458 bgcolor=#d6d6d6
| 598458 ||  || — || August 29, 2008 || Crni Vrh || S. Matičič ||  || align=right | 3.9 km || 
|-id=459 bgcolor=#fefefe
| 598459 ||  || — || September 26, 2013 || Catalina || CSS || H || align=right data-sort-value="0.82" | 820 m || 
|-id=460 bgcolor=#E9E9E9
| 598460 ||  || — || September 6, 2008 || Mount Lemmon || Mount Lemmon Survey || LEO || align=right | 1.4 km || 
|-id=461 bgcolor=#fefefe
| 598461 ||  || — || October 1, 2008 || Kitt Peak || Spacewatch || H || align=right data-sort-value="0.59" | 590 m || 
|-id=462 bgcolor=#E9E9E9
| 598462 ||  || — || September 22, 2008 || Kitt Peak || Spacewatch ||  || align=right | 1.2 km || 
|-id=463 bgcolor=#E9E9E9
| 598463 ||  || — || October 1, 2008 || Kitt Peak || Spacewatch ||  || align=right | 1.4 km || 
|-id=464 bgcolor=#E9E9E9
| 598464 ||  || — || October 1, 2008 || Mount Lemmon || Mount Lemmon Survey ||  || align=right data-sort-value="0.99" | 990 m || 
|-id=465 bgcolor=#E9E9E9
| 598465 ||  || — || October 2, 2008 || Kitt Peak || Spacewatch ||  || align=right data-sort-value="0.74" | 740 m || 
|-id=466 bgcolor=#E9E9E9
| 598466 ||  || — || October 2, 2008 || Kitt Peak || Spacewatch ||  || align=right data-sort-value="0.79" | 790 m || 
|-id=467 bgcolor=#fefefe
| 598467 ||  || — || October 2, 2008 || Mount Lemmon || Mount Lemmon Survey ||  || align=right data-sort-value="0.47" | 470 m || 
|-id=468 bgcolor=#E9E9E9
| 598468 ||  || — || September 6, 2008 || Catalina || CSS ||  || align=right | 1.6 km || 
|-id=469 bgcolor=#E9E9E9
| 598469 ||  || — || September 3, 2008 || Kitt Peak || Spacewatch ||  || align=right | 1.2 km || 
|-id=470 bgcolor=#C2FFFF
| 598470 ||  || — || September 25, 2008 || Kitt Peak || Spacewatch || L4 || align=right | 7.0 km || 
|-id=471 bgcolor=#C2FFFF
| 598471 ||  || — || September 20, 2008 || Kitt Peak || Spacewatch || L4 || align=right | 8.7 km || 
|-id=472 bgcolor=#E9E9E9
| 598472 ||  || — || September 23, 2008 || Mount Lemmon || Mount Lemmon Survey ||  || align=right | 1.7 km || 
|-id=473 bgcolor=#E9E9E9
| 598473 ||  || — || October 9, 2004 || Kitt Peak || Spacewatch ||  || align=right | 1.2 km || 
|-id=474 bgcolor=#E9E9E9
| 598474 ||  || — || September 23, 2008 || Kitt Peak || Spacewatch ||  || align=right | 1.9 km || 
|-id=475 bgcolor=#E9E9E9
| 598475 ||  || — || September 2, 2008 || Kitt Peak || Spacewatch ||  || align=right | 1.6 km || 
|-id=476 bgcolor=#E9E9E9
| 598476 ||  || — || October 7, 2008 || Mount Lemmon || Mount Lemmon Survey ||  || align=right | 1.6 km || 
|-id=477 bgcolor=#E9E9E9
| 598477 ||  || — || October 8, 2008 || Mount Lemmon || Mount Lemmon Survey ||  || align=right | 1.3 km || 
|-id=478 bgcolor=#E9E9E9
| 598478 ||  || — || October 9, 2008 || Mount Lemmon || Mount Lemmon Survey ||  || align=right | 1.0 km || 
|-id=479 bgcolor=#E9E9E9
| 598479 ||  || — || March 3, 2006 || Kitt Peak || Spacewatch ||  || align=right | 1.5 km || 
|-id=480 bgcolor=#E9E9E9
| 598480 ||  || — || October 9, 2008 || Mount Lemmon || Mount Lemmon Survey ||  || align=right data-sort-value="0.84" | 840 m || 
|-id=481 bgcolor=#E9E9E9
| 598481 ||  || — || October 9, 2008 || Mount Lemmon || Mount Lemmon Survey ||  || align=right data-sort-value="0.93" | 930 m || 
|-id=482 bgcolor=#fefefe
| 598482 ||  || — || October 1, 2008 || Mount Lemmon || Mount Lemmon Survey ||  || align=right data-sort-value="0.68" | 680 m || 
|-id=483 bgcolor=#d6d6d6
| 598483 ||  || — || October 1, 2008 || Kitt Peak || Spacewatch || 7:4 || align=right | 2.8 km || 
|-id=484 bgcolor=#fefefe
| 598484 ||  || — || October 1, 2008 || Mount Lemmon || Mount Lemmon Survey ||  || align=right data-sort-value="0.54" | 540 m || 
|-id=485 bgcolor=#E9E9E9
| 598485 ||  || — || October 10, 2008 || Mount Lemmon || Mount Lemmon Survey ||  || align=right | 1.0 km || 
|-id=486 bgcolor=#d6d6d6
| 598486 ||  || — || October 10, 2008 || Mount Lemmon || Mount Lemmon Survey ||  || align=right | 2.2 km || 
|-id=487 bgcolor=#E9E9E9
| 598487 ||  || — || October 9, 2008 || Kitt Peak || Spacewatch ||  || align=right | 1.3 km || 
|-id=488 bgcolor=#E9E9E9
| 598488 ||  || — || October 2, 2008 || Kitt Peak || Spacewatch ||  || align=right data-sort-value="0.69" | 690 m || 
|-id=489 bgcolor=#d6d6d6
| 598489 ||  || — || August 8, 2012 || Haleakala || Pan-STARRS ||  || align=right | 3.5 km || 
|-id=490 bgcolor=#C2FFFF
| 598490 ||  || — || October 2, 2008 || Mount Lemmon || Mount Lemmon Survey || L4 || align=right | 7.6 km || 
|-id=491 bgcolor=#FA8072
| 598491 ||  || — || October 9, 2008 || Mount Lemmon || Mount Lemmon Survey || H || align=right data-sort-value="0.54" | 540 m || 
|-id=492 bgcolor=#C2FFFF
| 598492 ||  || — || October 2, 2008 || Kitt Peak || Spacewatch || L4 || align=right | 7.7 km || 
|-id=493 bgcolor=#C2FFFF
| 598493 ||  || — || January 19, 2012 || Kitt Peak || Spacewatch || L4 || align=right | 8.0 km || 
|-id=494 bgcolor=#C2FFFF
| 598494 ||  || — || August 24, 2008 || Kitt Peak || Spacewatch || L4 || align=right | 6.6 km || 
|-id=495 bgcolor=#E9E9E9
| 598495 ||  || — || April 5, 2011 || Kitt Peak || Spacewatch ||  || align=right | 1.2 km || 
|-id=496 bgcolor=#E9E9E9
| 598496 ||  || — || October 3, 2008 || Mount Lemmon || Mount Lemmon Survey ||  || align=right | 1.1 km || 
|-id=497 bgcolor=#E9E9E9
| 598497 ||  || — || October 27, 2017 || Haleakala || Pan-STARRS ||  || align=right | 1.2 km || 
|-id=498 bgcolor=#d6d6d6
| 598498 ||  || — || October 1, 2008 || Mount Lemmon || Mount Lemmon Survey ||  || align=right | 3.4 km || 
|-id=499 bgcolor=#E9E9E9
| 598499 ||  || — || October 3, 2008 || Mount Lemmon || Mount Lemmon Survey ||  || align=right data-sort-value="0.93" | 930 m || 
|-id=500 bgcolor=#C2FFFF
| 598500 ||  || — || October 10, 2008 || Mount Lemmon || Mount Lemmon Survey || L4 || align=right | 6.7 km || 
|}

598501–598600 

|-bgcolor=#C2FFFF
| 598501 ||  || — || October 9, 2008 || Mount Lemmon || Mount Lemmon Survey || L4 || align=right | 7.6 km || 
|-id=502 bgcolor=#E9E9E9
| 598502 ||  || — || October 6, 2008 || Mount Lemmon || Mount Lemmon Survey ||  || align=right data-sort-value="0.59" | 590 m || 
|-id=503 bgcolor=#C2FFFF
| 598503 ||  || — || October 10, 2008 || Mount Lemmon || Mount Lemmon Survey || L4 || align=right | 7.6 km || 
|-id=504 bgcolor=#d6d6d6
| 598504 ||  || — || October 10, 2008 || Mount Lemmon || Mount Lemmon Survey ||  || align=right | 2.5 km || 
|-id=505 bgcolor=#C2FFFF
| 598505 ||  || — || October 1, 2008 || Mount Lemmon || Mount Lemmon Survey || L4 || align=right | 8.2 km || 
|-id=506 bgcolor=#d6d6d6
| 598506 ||  || — || October 8, 2008 || Mount Lemmon || Mount Lemmon Survey ||  || align=right | 2.2 km || 
|-id=507 bgcolor=#E9E9E9
| 598507 ||  || — || October 7, 2008 || Mount Lemmon || Mount Lemmon Survey ||  || align=right | 2.1 km || 
|-id=508 bgcolor=#E9E9E9
| 598508 ||  || — || October 10, 2008 || Mount Lemmon || Mount Lemmon Survey ||  || align=right | 1.3 km || 
|-id=509 bgcolor=#fefefe
| 598509 ||  || — || March 29, 2004 || Kitt Peak || Spacewatch ||  || align=right data-sort-value="0.57" | 570 m || 
|-id=510 bgcolor=#E9E9E9
| 598510 ||  || — || January 31, 2006 || Kitt Peak || Spacewatch ||  || align=right | 1.3 km || 
|-id=511 bgcolor=#E9E9E9
| 598511 ||  || — || October 20, 2008 || Kitt Peak || Spacewatch || MAR || align=right data-sort-value="0.90" | 900 m || 
|-id=512 bgcolor=#E9E9E9
| 598512 ||  || — || October 21, 2008 || Kitt Peak || Spacewatch ||  || align=right | 1.0 km || 
|-id=513 bgcolor=#fefefe
| 598513 ||  || — || October 21, 2008 || Kitt Peak || Spacewatch ||  || align=right data-sort-value="0.53" | 530 m || 
|-id=514 bgcolor=#E9E9E9
| 598514 ||  || — || October 22, 2008 || Kitt Peak || Spacewatch ||  || align=right | 1.1 km || 
|-id=515 bgcolor=#d6d6d6
| 598515 ||  || — || October 23, 2008 || Mount Lemmon || Mount Lemmon Survey || 7:4 || align=right | 2.9 km || 
|-id=516 bgcolor=#d6d6d6
| 598516 ||  || — || October 25, 2008 || Sandlot || G. Hug ||  || align=right | 2.7 km || 
|-id=517 bgcolor=#d6d6d6
| 598517 ||  || — || September 25, 2008 || Kitt Peak || Spacewatch ||  || align=right | 1.7 km || 
|-id=518 bgcolor=#fefefe
| 598518 ||  || — || September 24, 2008 || Kitt Peak || Spacewatch || H || align=right data-sort-value="0.51" | 510 m || 
|-id=519 bgcolor=#fefefe
| 598519 ||  || — || October 22, 2008 || Kitt Peak || Spacewatch ||  || align=right data-sort-value="0.74" | 740 m || 
|-id=520 bgcolor=#E9E9E9
| 598520 ||  || — || October 22, 2008 || Kitt Peak || Spacewatch ||  || align=right | 1.4 km || 
|-id=521 bgcolor=#fefefe
| 598521 ||  || — || October 22, 2008 || Kitt Peak || Spacewatch ||  || align=right data-sort-value="0.74" | 740 m || 
|-id=522 bgcolor=#fefefe
| 598522 ||  || — || October 22, 2008 || Kitt Peak || Spacewatch ||  || align=right data-sort-value="0.69" | 690 m || 
|-id=523 bgcolor=#E9E9E9
| 598523 ||  || — || April 9, 2002 || Palomar || NEAT ||  || align=right | 1.3 km || 
|-id=524 bgcolor=#fefefe
| 598524 ||  || — || April 14, 2007 || Kitt Peak || Spacewatch ||  || align=right data-sort-value="0.79" | 790 m || 
|-id=525 bgcolor=#fefefe
| 598525 ||  || — || March 26, 2007 || Mount Lemmon || Mount Lemmon Survey ||  || align=right data-sort-value="0.63" | 630 m || 
|-id=526 bgcolor=#E9E9E9
| 598526 ||  || — || October 8, 2008 || Kitt Peak || Spacewatch ||  || align=right | 1.1 km || 
|-id=527 bgcolor=#d6d6d6
| 598527 ||  || — || October 24, 2008 || Kitt Peak || Spacewatch || 3:2 || align=right | 3.0 km || 
|-id=528 bgcolor=#d6d6d6
| 598528 ||  || — || October 25, 2008 || Kitt Peak || Spacewatch ||  || align=right | 2.5 km || 
|-id=529 bgcolor=#E9E9E9
| 598529 ||  || — || October 20, 2008 || Kitt Peak || Spacewatch ||  || align=right | 1.6 km || 
|-id=530 bgcolor=#E9E9E9
| 598530 ||  || — || October 23, 2008 || Kitt Peak || Spacewatch ||  || align=right | 1.1 km || 
|-id=531 bgcolor=#E9E9E9
| 598531 ||  || — || October 24, 2008 || Kitt Peak || Spacewatch ||  || align=right | 1.3 km || 
|-id=532 bgcolor=#E9E9E9
| 598532 ||  || — || October 26, 2008 || Mount Lemmon || Mount Lemmon Survey ||  || align=right data-sort-value="0.74" | 740 m || 
|-id=533 bgcolor=#E9E9E9
| 598533 ||  || — || October 26, 2008 || Kitt Peak || Spacewatch ||  || align=right | 1.0 km || 
|-id=534 bgcolor=#E9E9E9
| 598534 ||  || — || October 26, 2008 || Kitt Peak || Spacewatch ||  || align=right | 1.9 km || 
|-id=535 bgcolor=#E9E9E9
| 598535 ||  || — || October 28, 2008 || Kitt Peak || Spacewatch ||  || align=right | 1.4 km || 
|-id=536 bgcolor=#E9E9E9
| 598536 ||  || — || October 28, 2008 || Kitt Peak || Spacewatch ||  || align=right | 1.2 km || 
|-id=537 bgcolor=#E9E9E9
| 598537 ||  || — || October 28, 2008 || Mount Lemmon || Mount Lemmon Survey ||  || align=right | 1.0 km || 
|-id=538 bgcolor=#E9E9E9
| 598538 ||  || — || October 28, 2008 || Kitt Peak || Spacewatch ||  || align=right | 1.3 km || 
|-id=539 bgcolor=#E9E9E9
| 598539 ||  || — || October 8, 2008 || Kitt Peak || Spacewatch ||  || align=right | 1.2 km || 
|-id=540 bgcolor=#E9E9E9
| 598540 ||  || — || October 21, 2008 || Kitt Peak || Spacewatch ||  || align=right | 1.2 km || 
|-id=541 bgcolor=#E9E9E9
| 598541 ||  || — || October 28, 2008 || Kitt Peak || Spacewatch ||  || align=right | 2.2 km || 
|-id=542 bgcolor=#fefefe
| 598542 ||  || — || October 8, 2008 || Catalina || CSS || H || align=right data-sort-value="0.44" | 440 m || 
|-id=543 bgcolor=#E9E9E9
| 598543 ||  || — || April 26, 2006 || Cerro Tololo || Cerro Tololo Obs. ||  || align=right | 2.0 km || 
|-id=544 bgcolor=#E9E9E9
| 598544 ||  || — || April 2, 2006 || Kitt Peak || Spacewatch ||  || align=right | 1.4 km || 
|-id=545 bgcolor=#E9E9E9
| 598545 ||  || — || August 3, 2016 || Haleakala || Pan-STARRS ||  || align=right | 1.2 km || 
|-id=546 bgcolor=#E9E9E9
| 598546 ||  || — || August 24, 2003 || Palomar || NEAT ||  || align=right | 2.7 km || 
|-id=547 bgcolor=#E9E9E9
| 598547 ||  || — || November 9, 2013 || Mount Lemmon || Mount Lemmon Survey ||  || align=right | 1.4 km || 
|-id=548 bgcolor=#E9E9E9
| 598548 ||  || — || October 24, 2008 || Catalina || CSS ||  || align=right | 1.2 km || 
|-id=549 bgcolor=#E9E9E9
| 598549 ||  || — || October 9, 2008 || Mount Lemmon || Mount Lemmon Survey ||  || align=right | 1.4 km || 
|-id=550 bgcolor=#C2FFFF
| 598550 ||  || — || December 17, 1999 || Kitt Peak || Spacewatch || L4 || align=right | 7.3 km || 
|-id=551 bgcolor=#fefefe
| 598551 ||  || — || October 28, 2008 || Kitt Peak || Spacewatch || H || align=right data-sort-value="0.48" | 480 m || 
|-id=552 bgcolor=#E9E9E9
| 598552 ||  || — || April 18, 2015 || Haleakala || Pan-STARRS ||  || align=right | 1.0 km || 
|-id=553 bgcolor=#E9E9E9
| 598553 ||  || — || February 26, 2014 || Catalina || CSS ||  || align=right data-sort-value="0.99" | 990 m || 
|-id=554 bgcolor=#E9E9E9
| 598554 ||  || — || October 28, 2008 || Kitt Peak || Spacewatch ||  || align=right | 1.5 km || 
|-id=555 bgcolor=#E9E9E9
| 598555 ||  || — || October 29, 2008 || Mount Lemmon || Mount Lemmon Survey ||  || align=right | 1.1 km || 
|-id=556 bgcolor=#E9E9E9
| 598556 ||  || — || December 31, 2013 || Kitt Peak || Spacewatch ||  || align=right | 1.2 km || 
|-id=557 bgcolor=#d6d6d6
| 598557 ||  || — || January 16, 2011 || Mount Lemmon || Mount Lemmon Survey ||  || align=right | 3.0 km || 
|-id=558 bgcolor=#E9E9E9
| 598558 ||  || — || October 29, 2008 || Mount Lemmon || Mount Lemmon Survey ||  || align=right data-sort-value="0.80" | 800 m || 
|-id=559 bgcolor=#E9E9E9
| 598559 ||  || — || April 25, 2015 || Haleakala || Pan-STARRS ||  || align=right | 1.1 km || 
|-id=560 bgcolor=#C2FFFF
| 598560 ||  || — || February 14, 2013 || Haleakala || Pan-STARRS || L4 || align=right | 7.3 km || 
|-id=561 bgcolor=#d6d6d6
| 598561 ||  || — || October 28, 2008 || Kitt Peak || Spacewatch ||  || align=right | 1.6 km || 
|-id=562 bgcolor=#E9E9E9
| 598562 ||  || — || October 29, 2008 || Kitt Peak || Spacewatch ||  || align=right | 1.4 km || 
|-id=563 bgcolor=#E9E9E9
| 598563 ||  || — || October 24, 2008 || Kitt Peak || Spacewatch ||  || align=right | 1.7 km || 
|-id=564 bgcolor=#E9E9E9
| 598564 ||  || — || October 28, 2008 || Kitt Peak || Spacewatch ||  || align=right data-sort-value="0.97" | 970 m || 
|-id=565 bgcolor=#E9E9E9
| 598565 ||  || — || October 27, 2008 || Mount Lemmon || Mount Lemmon Survey ||  || align=right | 1.3 km || 
|-id=566 bgcolor=#E9E9E9
| 598566 ||  || — || October 20, 2008 || Kitt Peak || Spacewatch ||  || align=right | 1.3 km || 
|-id=567 bgcolor=#d6d6d6
| 598567 ||  || — || October 25, 2008 || Mount Lemmon || Mount Lemmon Survey ||  || align=right | 1.6 km || 
|-id=568 bgcolor=#FA8072
| 598568 ||  || — || October 26, 2008 || Kitt Peak || Spacewatch ||  || align=right data-sort-value="0.46" | 460 m || 
|-id=569 bgcolor=#E9E9E9
| 598569 ||  || — || September 26, 2008 || Bergisch Gladbach || W. Bickel ||  || align=right | 1.4 km || 
|-id=570 bgcolor=#d6d6d6
| 598570 ||  || — || November 2, 2008 || Mount Lemmon || Mount Lemmon Survey ||  || align=right | 2.5 km || 
|-id=571 bgcolor=#fefefe
| 598571 ||  || — || January 22, 2006 || Mount Lemmon || Mount Lemmon Survey ||  || align=right data-sort-value="0.57" | 570 m || 
|-id=572 bgcolor=#E9E9E9
| 598572 ||  || — || December 3, 2005 || Mauna Kea || Mauna Kea Obs. ||  || align=right data-sort-value="0.95" | 950 m || 
|-id=573 bgcolor=#fefefe
| 598573 ||  || — || October 1, 2008 || Kitt Peak || Spacewatch ||  || align=right data-sort-value="0.76" | 760 m || 
|-id=574 bgcolor=#E9E9E9
| 598574 ||  || — || July 4, 2003 || Kitt Peak || Spacewatch ||  || align=right | 1.6 km || 
|-id=575 bgcolor=#E9E9E9
| 598575 ||  || — || November 2, 2008 || Mount Lemmon || Mount Lemmon Survey ||  || align=right | 1.9 km || 
|-id=576 bgcolor=#d6d6d6
| 598576 ||  || — || October 20, 2008 || Kitt Peak || Spacewatch || 7:4 || align=right | 2.8 km || 
|-id=577 bgcolor=#E9E9E9
| 598577 ||  || — || October 24, 2008 || Catalina || CSS ||  || align=right | 1.5 km || 
|-id=578 bgcolor=#fefefe
| 598578 ||  || — || November 2, 2008 || Mount Lemmon || Mount Lemmon Survey ||  || align=right data-sort-value="0.46" | 460 m || 
|-id=579 bgcolor=#E9E9E9
| 598579 ||  || — || October 6, 2008 || Mount Lemmon || Mount Lemmon Survey ||  || align=right | 1.1 km || 
|-id=580 bgcolor=#E9E9E9
| 598580 ||  || — || September 28, 2008 || Mount Lemmon || Mount Lemmon Survey ||  || align=right | 1.8 km || 
|-id=581 bgcolor=#E9E9E9
| 598581 ||  || — || November 4, 2008 || Bergisch Gladbach || W. Bickel ||  || align=right | 1.2 km || 
|-id=582 bgcolor=#E9E9E9
| 598582 ||  || — || September 24, 2008 || Kitt Peak || Spacewatch ||  || align=right data-sort-value="0.77" | 770 m || 
|-id=583 bgcolor=#E9E9E9
| 598583 ||  || — || October 25, 2008 || Socorro || LINEAR ||  || align=right | 2.4 km || 
|-id=584 bgcolor=#E9E9E9
| 598584 ||  || — || September 23, 2008 || Kitt Peak || Spacewatch ||  || align=right | 1.5 km || 
|-id=585 bgcolor=#E9E9E9
| 598585 ||  || — || November 8, 2008 || Mount Lemmon || Mount Lemmon Survey ||  || align=right | 1.7 km || 
|-id=586 bgcolor=#FA8072
| 598586 ||  || — || November 3, 2008 || Catalina || CSS || H || align=right data-sort-value="0.61" | 610 m || 
|-id=587 bgcolor=#E9E9E9
| 598587 ||  || — || November 2, 2008 || Mount Lemmon || Mount Lemmon Survey ||  || align=right | 1.5 km || 
|-id=588 bgcolor=#E9E9E9
| 598588 ||  || — || October 20, 2012 || Haleakala || Pan-STARRS ||  || align=right data-sort-value="0.96" | 960 m || 
|-id=589 bgcolor=#E9E9E9
| 598589 ||  || — || November 7, 2008 || Mount Lemmon || Mount Lemmon Survey ||  || align=right | 1.2 km || 
|-id=590 bgcolor=#fefefe
| 598590 ||  || — || February 15, 2013 || Haleakala || Pan-STARRS ||  || align=right data-sort-value="0.55" | 550 m || 
|-id=591 bgcolor=#E9E9E9
| 598591 ||  || — || November 7, 2008 || Mount Lemmon || Mount Lemmon Survey ||  || align=right | 1.5 km || 
|-id=592 bgcolor=#E9E9E9
| 598592 ||  || — || October 8, 2012 || Mount Lemmon || Mount Lemmon Survey ||  || align=right | 1.1 km || 
|-id=593 bgcolor=#E9E9E9
| 598593 ||  || — || October 26, 2008 || Mount Lemmon || Mount Lemmon Survey ||  || align=right | 1.2 km || 
|-id=594 bgcolor=#E9E9E9
| 598594 ||  || — || November 7, 2008 || Mount Lemmon || Mount Lemmon Survey ||  || align=right data-sort-value="0.72" | 720 m || 
|-id=595 bgcolor=#E9E9E9
| 598595 ||  || — || November 2, 2008 || Mount Lemmon || Mount Lemmon Survey ||  || align=right | 1.1 km || 
|-id=596 bgcolor=#fefefe
| 598596 ||  || — || November 2, 2008 || Mount Lemmon || Mount Lemmon Survey ||  || align=right data-sort-value="0.63" | 630 m || 
|-id=597 bgcolor=#d6d6d6
| 598597 ||  || — || September 10, 2002 || Palomar || NEAT ||  || align=right | 2.1 km || 
|-id=598 bgcolor=#d6d6d6
| 598598 ||  || — || November 7, 2008 || Mount Lemmon || Mount Lemmon Survey ||  || align=right | 2.5 km || 
|-id=599 bgcolor=#E9E9E9
| 598599 ||  || — || November 2, 2008 || Mount Lemmon || Mount Lemmon Survey ||  || align=right | 1.5 km || 
|-id=600 bgcolor=#E9E9E9
| 598600 ||  || — || November 17, 2008 || Kitt Peak || Spacewatch ||  || align=right | 1.7 km || 
|}

598601–598700 

|-bgcolor=#E9E9E9
| 598601 ||  || — || April 26, 2006 || Cerro Tololo || Cerro Tololo Obs. ||  || align=right | 1.6 km || 
|-id=602 bgcolor=#E9E9E9
| 598602 ||  || — || November 17, 2008 || Kitt Peak || Spacewatch ||  || align=right | 1.3 km || 
|-id=603 bgcolor=#E9E9E9
| 598603 ||  || — || November 17, 2008 || Kitt Peak || Spacewatch ||  || align=right | 1.3 km || 
|-id=604 bgcolor=#E9E9E9
| 598604 ||  || — || November 17, 2008 || Kitt Peak || Spacewatch ||  || align=right | 1.0 km || 
|-id=605 bgcolor=#E9E9E9
| 598605 ||  || — || November 17, 2008 || Kitt Peak || Spacewatch ||  || align=right | 1.1 km || 
|-id=606 bgcolor=#E9E9E9
| 598606 ||  || — || November 20, 2008 || Kitt Peak || Spacewatch ||  || align=right | 1.6 km || 
|-id=607 bgcolor=#E9E9E9
| 598607 ||  || — || October 26, 2008 || Kitt Peak || Spacewatch || HNS || align=right | 1.00 km || 
|-id=608 bgcolor=#d6d6d6
| 598608 ||  || — || November 20, 2008 || Kitt Peak || Spacewatch ||  || align=right | 2.2 km || 
|-id=609 bgcolor=#E9E9E9
| 598609 ||  || — || October 1, 2008 || Mount Lemmon || Mount Lemmon Survey ||  || align=right | 1.5 km || 
|-id=610 bgcolor=#fefefe
| 598610 ||  || — || November 21, 2008 || Kitt Peak || Spacewatch ||  || align=right data-sort-value="0.59" | 590 m || 
|-id=611 bgcolor=#fefefe
| 598611 ||  || — || November 21, 2008 || Cerro Burek || Alianza S4 Obs. || H || align=right data-sort-value="0.77" | 770 m || 
|-id=612 bgcolor=#E9E9E9
| 598612 ||  || — || November 19, 2008 || Kitt Peak || Spacewatch ||  || align=right | 1.0 km || 
|-id=613 bgcolor=#E9E9E9
| 598613 ||  || — || November 30, 2008 || Kitt Peak || Spacewatch ||  || align=right | 1.9 km || 
|-id=614 bgcolor=#E9E9E9
| 598614 ||  || — || November 28, 2008 || Cerro Burek || Alianza S4 Obs. ||  || align=right | 1.8 km || 
|-id=615 bgcolor=#E9E9E9
| 598615 ||  || — || November 30, 2008 || Mount Lemmon || Mount Lemmon Survey ||  || align=right | 1.7 km || 
|-id=616 bgcolor=#E9E9E9
| 598616 ||  || — || March 25, 2006 || Kitt Peak || Spacewatch ||  || align=right | 1.6 km || 
|-id=617 bgcolor=#E9E9E9
| 598617 ||  || — || November 24, 2008 || Mount Lemmon || Mount Lemmon Survey ||  || align=right | 2.2 km || 
|-id=618 bgcolor=#E9E9E9
| 598618 ||  || — || November 30, 2008 || Kitt Peak || Spacewatch ||  || align=right | 2.1 km || 
|-id=619 bgcolor=#E9E9E9
| 598619 ||  || — || November 20, 2008 || Kitt Peak || Spacewatch ||  || align=right data-sort-value="0.99" | 990 m || 
|-id=620 bgcolor=#E9E9E9
| 598620 ||  || — || November 18, 2008 || Kitt Peak || Spacewatch ||  || align=right | 1.5 km || 
|-id=621 bgcolor=#E9E9E9
| 598621 ||  || — || November 19, 2008 || Mount Lemmon || Mount Lemmon Survey ||  || align=right | 2.0 km || 
|-id=622 bgcolor=#E9E9E9
| 598622 ||  || — || October 10, 2012 || Kitt Peak || Spacewatch ||  || align=right | 1.7 km || 
|-id=623 bgcolor=#E9E9E9
| 598623 ||  || — || May 21, 2015 || Haleakala || Pan-STARRS ||  || align=right | 1.1 km || 
|-id=624 bgcolor=#E9E9E9
| 598624 ||  || — || November 18, 2008 || Kitt Peak || Spacewatch ||  || align=right | 1.3 km || 
|-id=625 bgcolor=#d6d6d6
| 598625 ||  || — || November 20, 2008 || Mount Lemmon || Mount Lemmon Survey ||  || align=right | 2.7 km || 
|-id=626 bgcolor=#d6d6d6
| 598626 ||  || — || November 20, 2008 || Kitt Peak || Spacewatch ||  || align=right | 1.5 km || 
|-id=627 bgcolor=#d6d6d6
| 598627 ||  || — || November 24, 2008 || Kitt Peak || Spacewatch ||  || align=right | 2.9 km || 
|-id=628 bgcolor=#d6d6d6
| 598628 ||  || — || November 23, 2008 || Kitt Peak || Spacewatch ||  || align=right | 2.1 km || 
|-id=629 bgcolor=#FA8072
| 598629 ||  || — || December 4, 2008 || Socorro || LINEAR || H || align=right data-sort-value="0.55" | 550 m || 
|-id=630 bgcolor=#E9E9E9
| 598630 ||  || — || December 2, 2008 || Mount Lemmon || Mount Lemmon Survey ||  || align=right | 1.4 km || 
|-id=631 bgcolor=#d6d6d6
| 598631 ||  || — || September 10, 2007 || Mount Lemmon || Mount Lemmon Survey || 3:2 || align=right | 4.4 km || 
|-id=632 bgcolor=#E9E9E9
| 598632 ||  || — || January 19, 2005 || Kitt Peak || Spacewatch ||  || align=right | 1.3 km || 
|-id=633 bgcolor=#E9E9E9
| 598633 ||  || — || December 20, 2004 || Mount Lemmon || Mount Lemmon Survey ||  || align=right | 1.9 km || 
|-id=634 bgcolor=#E9E9E9
| 598634 ||  || — || December 4, 2008 || Mount Lemmon || Mount Lemmon Survey ||  || align=right | 1.8 km || 
|-id=635 bgcolor=#E9E9E9
| 598635 ||  || — || October 30, 2008 || Kitt Peak || Spacewatch ||  || align=right | 1.3 km || 
|-id=636 bgcolor=#d6d6d6
| 598636 ||  || — || December 1, 2008 || Kitt Peak || Spacewatch ||  || align=right | 2.9 km || 
|-id=637 bgcolor=#fefefe
| 598637 ||  || — || December 4, 2008 || Kitt Peak || Spacewatch ||  || align=right data-sort-value="0.72" | 720 m || 
|-id=638 bgcolor=#E9E9E9
| 598638 ||  || — || June 6, 2011 || Haleakala || Pan-STARRS ||  || align=right data-sort-value="0.84" | 840 m || 
|-id=639 bgcolor=#fefefe
| 598639 ||  || — || October 3, 2011 || XuYi || PMO NEO ||  || align=right data-sort-value="0.76" | 760 m || 
|-id=640 bgcolor=#E9E9E9
| 598640 ||  || — || December 1, 2008 || Kitt Peak || Spacewatch ||  || align=right | 1.7 km || 
|-id=641 bgcolor=#E9E9E9
| 598641 ||  || — || November 13, 2012 || Mount Lemmon || Mount Lemmon Survey ||  || align=right | 1.3 km || 
|-id=642 bgcolor=#E9E9E9
| 598642 ||  || — || November 18, 2008 || Kitt Peak || Spacewatch ||  || align=right | 1.3 km || 
|-id=643 bgcolor=#E9E9E9
| 598643 ||  || — || November 7, 2008 || Mount Lemmon || Mount Lemmon Survey ||  || align=right | 1.4 km || 
|-id=644 bgcolor=#E9E9E9
| 598644 ||  || — || December 3, 2008 || Mount Lemmon || Mount Lemmon Survey ||  || align=right data-sort-value="0.83" | 830 m || 
|-id=645 bgcolor=#E9E9E9
| 598645 ||  || — || December 7, 2008 || Kitt Peak || Spacewatch ||  || align=right data-sort-value="0.87" | 870 m || 
|-id=646 bgcolor=#E9E9E9
| 598646 ||  || — || December 19, 2008 || Calar Alto || F. Hormuth ||  || align=right | 1.4 km || 
|-id=647 bgcolor=#fefefe
| 598647 ||  || — || December 21, 2008 || Socorro || LINEAR || H || align=right data-sort-value="0.67" | 670 m || 
|-id=648 bgcolor=#E9E9E9
| 598648 ||  || — || December 21, 2008 || Piszkesteto || K. Sárneczky ||  || align=right | 1.4 km || 
|-id=649 bgcolor=#E9E9E9
| 598649 ||  || — || December 29, 2008 || Mount Lemmon || Mount Lemmon Survey ||  || align=right | 1.9 km || 
|-id=650 bgcolor=#E9E9E9
| 598650 ||  || — || December 29, 2008 || Kitt Peak || Spacewatch ||  || align=right | 1.9 km || 
|-id=651 bgcolor=#fefefe
| 598651 ||  || — || December 29, 2008 || Mount Lemmon || Mount Lemmon Survey ||  || align=right data-sort-value="0.57" | 570 m || 
|-id=652 bgcolor=#E9E9E9
| 598652 ||  || — || October 8, 2007 || Mount Lemmon || Mount Lemmon Survey ||  || align=right | 1.7 km || 
|-id=653 bgcolor=#E9E9E9
| 598653 ||  || — || October 10, 2007 || Mount Lemmon || Mount Lemmon Survey ||  || align=right | 1.9 km || 
|-id=654 bgcolor=#E9E9E9
| 598654 ||  || — || August 28, 2003 || Haleakala || AMOS || JUN || align=right | 1.1 km || 
|-id=655 bgcolor=#d6d6d6
| 598655 ||  || — || December 22, 2003 || Kitt Peak || Spacewatch ||  || align=right | 2.5 km || 
|-id=656 bgcolor=#d6d6d6
| 598656 ||  || — || December 30, 2008 || Mount Lemmon || Mount Lemmon Survey ||  || align=right | 2.0 km || 
|-id=657 bgcolor=#E9E9E9
| 598657 ||  || — || December 29, 2008 || Mount Lemmon || Mount Lemmon Survey ||  || align=right | 2.2 km || 
|-id=658 bgcolor=#d6d6d6
| 598658 ||  || — || December 30, 2008 || Mount Lemmon || Mount Lemmon Survey ||  || align=right | 2.0 km || 
|-id=659 bgcolor=#E9E9E9
| 598659 ||  || — || December 30, 2008 || Mount Lemmon || Mount Lemmon Survey ||  || align=right | 1.7 km || 
|-id=660 bgcolor=#E9E9E9
| 598660 ||  || — || December 30, 2008 || Mount Lemmon || Mount Lemmon Survey ||  || align=right | 1.4 km || 
|-id=661 bgcolor=#d6d6d6
| 598661 ||  || — || January 16, 2015 || Haleakala || Pan-STARRS ||  || align=right | 2.7 km || 
|-id=662 bgcolor=#E9E9E9
| 598662 ||  || — || December 31, 2008 || Kitt Peak || Spacewatch ||  || align=right | 1.5 km || 
|-id=663 bgcolor=#d6d6d6
| 598663 ||  || — || December 31, 2008 || Kitt Peak || Spacewatch ||  || align=right | 3.5 km || 
|-id=664 bgcolor=#d6d6d6
| 598664 ||  || — || December 29, 2008 || Mount Lemmon || Mount Lemmon Survey ||  || align=right | 2.6 km || 
|-id=665 bgcolor=#E9E9E9
| 598665 ||  || — || December 29, 2008 || Kitt Peak || Spacewatch ||  || align=right | 1.4 km || 
|-id=666 bgcolor=#E9E9E9
| 598666 ||  || — || December 30, 2008 || Kitt Peak || Spacewatch ||  || align=right | 1.5 km || 
|-id=667 bgcolor=#fefefe
| 598667 ||  || — || December 30, 2008 || Kitt Peak || Spacewatch ||  || align=right data-sort-value="0.44" | 440 m || 
|-id=668 bgcolor=#d6d6d6
| 598668 ||  || — || October 8, 2007 || Catalina || CSS ||  || align=right | 3.0 km || 
|-id=669 bgcolor=#E9E9E9
| 598669 ||  || — || December 22, 2008 || Kitt Peak || Spacewatch ||  || align=right data-sort-value="0.73" | 730 m || 
|-id=670 bgcolor=#fefefe
| 598670 ||  || — || December 30, 2008 || Kitt Peak || Spacewatch ||  || align=right data-sort-value="0.75" | 750 m || 
|-id=671 bgcolor=#E9E9E9
| 598671 ||  || — || December 30, 2008 || Kitt Peak || Spacewatch ||  || align=right | 1.4 km || 
|-id=672 bgcolor=#E9E9E9
| 598672 ||  || — || January 18, 2005 || Kitt Peak || Spacewatch ||  || align=right | 1.8 km || 
|-id=673 bgcolor=#E9E9E9
| 598673 ||  || — || December 21, 2008 || Mount Lemmon || Mount Lemmon Survey ||  || align=right | 1.6 km || 
|-id=674 bgcolor=#d6d6d6
| 598674 ||  || — || December 22, 2008 || Kitt Peak || Spacewatch ||  || align=right | 2.2 km || 
|-id=675 bgcolor=#E9E9E9
| 598675 ||  || — || June 3, 2011 || Mount Lemmon || Mount Lemmon Survey ||  || align=right data-sort-value="0.87" | 870 m || 
|-id=676 bgcolor=#E9E9E9
| 598676 ||  || — || December 21, 2008 || Mount Lemmon || Mount Lemmon Survey ||  || align=right | 2.0 km || 
|-id=677 bgcolor=#d6d6d6
| 598677 ||  || — || October 17, 2012 || Haleakala || Pan-STARRS ||  || align=right | 2.1 km || 
|-id=678 bgcolor=#E9E9E9
| 598678 ||  || — || February 26, 2014 || Haleakala || Pan-STARRS ||  || align=right | 1.4 km || 
|-id=679 bgcolor=#fefefe
| 598679 ||  || — || December 21, 2008 || Catalina || CSS || H || align=right data-sort-value="0.57" | 570 m || 
|-id=680 bgcolor=#E9E9E9
| 598680 ||  || — || November 24, 2008 || Kitt Peak || Spacewatch ||  || align=right | 1.0 km || 
|-id=681 bgcolor=#E9E9E9
| 598681 ||  || — || August 30, 2016 || Haleakala || Pan-STARRS ||  || align=right | 1.6 km || 
|-id=682 bgcolor=#E9E9E9
| 598682 ||  || — || December 31, 2008 || Mount Lemmon || Mount Lemmon Survey ||  || align=right | 1.5 km || 
|-id=683 bgcolor=#E9E9E9
| 598683 ||  || — || October 16, 2012 || Mount Lemmon || Mount Lemmon Survey ||  || align=right | 1.5 km || 
|-id=684 bgcolor=#E9E9E9
| 598684 ||  || — || October 18, 2012 || Haleakala || Pan-STARRS ||  || align=right | 1.2 km || 
|-id=685 bgcolor=#fefefe
| 598685 ||  || — || April 8, 2013 || Kitt Peak || Spacewatch ||  || align=right data-sort-value="0.53" | 530 m || 
|-id=686 bgcolor=#E9E9E9
| 598686 ||  || — || December 21, 2008 || Kitt Peak || Spacewatch ||  || align=right | 1.7 km || 
|-id=687 bgcolor=#E9E9E9
| 598687 ||  || — || January 1, 2009 || Kitt Peak || Spacewatch ||  || align=right | 1.6 km || 
|-id=688 bgcolor=#E9E9E9
| 598688 ||  || — || December 4, 2008 || Mount Lemmon || Mount Lemmon Survey ||  || align=right | 1.2 km || 
|-id=689 bgcolor=#E9E9E9
| 598689 ||  || — || September 13, 2007 || Mount Lemmon || Mount Lemmon Survey ||  || align=right | 1.8 km || 
|-id=690 bgcolor=#E9E9E9
| 598690 ||  || — || September 13, 2007 || Mount Lemmon || Mount Lemmon Survey ||  || align=right | 1.4 km || 
|-id=691 bgcolor=#fefefe
| 598691 ||  || — || April 2, 2006 || Mount Lemmon || Mount Lemmon Survey ||  || align=right data-sort-value="0.59" | 590 m || 
|-id=692 bgcolor=#E9E9E9
| 598692 ||  || — || January 2, 2009 || Mount Lemmon || Mount Lemmon Survey ||  || align=right | 1.8 km || 
|-id=693 bgcolor=#E9E9E9
| 598693 ||  || — || January 3, 2009 || Kitt Peak || Spacewatch ||  || align=right | 2.6 km || 
|-id=694 bgcolor=#E9E9E9
| 598694 ||  || — || January 2, 2009 || Kitt Peak || Spacewatch ||  || align=right | 1.9 km || 
|-id=695 bgcolor=#E9E9E9
| 598695 ||  || — || January 2, 2009 || Kitt Peak || Spacewatch ||  || align=right data-sort-value="0.69" | 690 m || 
|-id=696 bgcolor=#E9E9E9
| 598696 ||  || — || May 24, 2006 || Kitt Peak || Spacewatch ||  || align=right | 1.8 km || 
|-id=697 bgcolor=#fefefe
| 598697 ||  || — || January 2, 2009 || Kitt Peak || Spacewatch ||  || align=right data-sort-value="0.60" | 600 m || 
|-id=698 bgcolor=#E9E9E9
| 598698 ||  || — || January 21, 2009 || Mount Lemmon || Mount Lemmon Survey ||  || align=right | 1.6 km || 
|-id=699 bgcolor=#E9E9E9
| 598699 ||  || — || January 1, 2009 || Kitt Peak || Spacewatch ||  || align=right | 1.8 km || 
|-id=700 bgcolor=#E9E9E9
| 598700 ||  || — || October 22, 2003 || Kitt Peak || Spacewatch ||  || align=right | 1.2 km || 
|}

598701–598800 

|-bgcolor=#E9E9E9
| 598701 ||  || — || April 30, 2011 || Mount Lemmon || Mount Lemmon Survey ||  || align=right | 2.0 km || 
|-id=702 bgcolor=#fefefe
| 598702 ||  || — || March 19, 2013 || Haleakala || Pan-STARRS ||  || align=right data-sort-value="0.55" | 550 m || 
|-id=703 bgcolor=#E9E9E9
| 598703 ||  || — || January 1, 2009 || Mount Lemmon || Mount Lemmon Survey ||  || align=right | 1.7 km || 
|-id=704 bgcolor=#E9E9E9
| 598704 ||  || — || March 28, 2015 || Haleakala || Pan-STARRS ||  || align=right | 2.4 km || 
|-id=705 bgcolor=#E9E9E9
| 598705 ||  || — || June 24, 1995 || Kitt Peak || Spacewatch ||  || align=right | 1.2 km || 
|-id=706 bgcolor=#E9E9E9
| 598706 ||  || — || January 10, 2014 || Mount Lemmon || Mount Lemmon Survey ||  || align=right | 2.0 km || 
|-id=707 bgcolor=#E9E9E9
| 598707 ||  || — || January 2, 2009 || Mount Lemmon || Mount Lemmon Survey ||  || align=right | 1.3 km || 
|-id=708 bgcolor=#E9E9E9
| 598708 ||  || — || January 2, 2009 || Kitt Peak || Spacewatch ||  || align=right | 1.7 km || 
|-id=709 bgcolor=#E9E9E9
| 598709 ||  || — || January 1, 2009 || Kitt Peak || Spacewatch ||  || align=right | 1.8 km || 
|-id=710 bgcolor=#E9E9E9
| 598710 ||  || — || January 2, 2009 || Kitt Peak || Spacewatch ||  || align=right | 1.2 km || 
|-id=711 bgcolor=#fefefe
| 598711 ||  || — || December 31, 2008 || Mount Lemmon || Mount Lemmon Survey ||  || align=right | 1.0 km || 
|-id=712 bgcolor=#fefefe
| 598712 ||  || — || January 17, 2009 || Mount Lemmon || Mount Lemmon Survey || H || align=right data-sort-value="0.62" | 620 m || 
|-id=713 bgcolor=#E9E9E9
| 598713 ||  || — || January 17, 2009 || Kitt Peak || Spacewatch ||  || align=right | 1.7 km || 
|-id=714 bgcolor=#fefefe
| 598714 ||  || — || January 2, 2009 || Kitt Peak || Spacewatch ||  || align=right data-sort-value="0.51" | 510 m || 
|-id=715 bgcolor=#E9E9E9
| 598715 ||  || — || January 16, 2009 || Kitt Peak || Spacewatch ||  || align=right | 1.7 km || 
|-id=716 bgcolor=#E9E9E9
| 598716 ||  || — || October 1, 2003 || Anderson Mesa || LONEOS ||  || align=right | 1.6 km || 
|-id=717 bgcolor=#d6d6d6
| 598717 ||  || — || January 1, 2009 || Mount Lemmon || Mount Lemmon Survey ||  || align=right | 1.9 km || 
|-id=718 bgcolor=#E9E9E9
| 598718 ||  || — || January 16, 2009 || Mount Lemmon || Mount Lemmon Survey ||  || align=right | 1.8 km || 
|-id=719 bgcolor=#E9E9E9
| 598719 Alegalli ||  ||  || July 9, 2002 || Complejo Astronomi || R. Gil-Hutton, J. Licandro ||  || align=right | 1.7 km || 
|-id=720 bgcolor=#fefefe
| 598720 ||  || — || January 20, 2009 || Kitt Peak || Spacewatch ||  || align=right data-sort-value="0.43" | 430 m || 
|-id=721 bgcolor=#FA8072
| 598721 ||  || — || January 29, 2009 || Siding Spring || SSS ||  || align=right | 1.7 km || 
|-id=722 bgcolor=#fefefe
| 598722 ||  || — || January 15, 2009 || Kitt Peak || Spacewatch ||  || align=right data-sort-value="0.65" | 650 m || 
|-id=723 bgcolor=#fefefe
| 598723 ||  || — || January 25, 2009 || Kitt Peak || Spacewatch ||  || align=right data-sort-value="0.64" | 640 m || 
|-id=724 bgcolor=#d6d6d6
| 598724 ||  || — || September 14, 2007 || Mount Lemmon || Mount Lemmon Survey ||  || align=right | 1.8 km || 
|-id=725 bgcolor=#E9E9E9
| 598725 ||  || — || November 23, 2008 || Mount Lemmon || Mount Lemmon Survey || AGN || align=right | 1.0 km || 
|-id=726 bgcolor=#E9E9E9
| 598726 ||  || — || January 29, 2009 || Mount Lemmon || Mount Lemmon Survey ||  || align=right | 2.3 km || 
|-id=727 bgcolor=#d6d6d6
| 598727 ||  || — || January 29, 2009 || Mount Lemmon || Mount Lemmon Survey ||  || align=right | 2.4 km || 
|-id=728 bgcolor=#E9E9E9
| 598728 ||  || — || January 25, 2009 || Kitt Peak || Spacewatch ||  || align=right | 1.6 km || 
|-id=729 bgcolor=#E9E9E9
| 598729 ||  || — || February 3, 2009 || Kitt Peak || Spacewatch ||  || align=right | 1.5 km || 
|-id=730 bgcolor=#fefefe
| 598730 ||  || — || January 16, 2009 || Mount Lemmon || Mount Lemmon Survey ||  || align=right data-sort-value="0.53" | 530 m || 
|-id=731 bgcolor=#E9E9E9
| 598731 ||  || — || January 29, 2009 || Kitt Peak || Spacewatch ||  || align=right | 1.8 km || 
|-id=732 bgcolor=#E9E9E9
| 598732 ||  || — || January 31, 2009 || Mount Lemmon || Mount Lemmon Survey ||  || align=right | 2.0 km || 
|-id=733 bgcolor=#E9E9E9
| 598733 ||  || — || December 31, 2008 || Mount Lemmon || Mount Lemmon Survey ||  || align=right | 1.5 km || 
|-id=734 bgcolor=#d6d6d6
| 598734 ||  || — || January 20, 2009 || Kitt Peak || Spacewatch ||  || align=right | 2.0 km || 
|-id=735 bgcolor=#E9E9E9
| 598735 ||  || — || October 16, 2007 || Kitt Peak || Spacewatch ||  || align=right | 1.6 km || 
|-id=736 bgcolor=#fefefe
| 598736 ||  || — || April 2, 2006 || Kitt Peak || Spacewatch ||  || align=right data-sort-value="0.56" | 560 m || 
|-id=737 bgcolor=#fefefe
| 598737 ||  || — || January 30, 2009 || Mount Lemmon || Mount Lemmon Survey || H || align=right data-sort-value="0.77" | 770 m || 
|-id=738 bgcolor=#E9E9E9
| 598738 ||  || — || January 31, 2009 || Mount Lemmon || Mount Lemmon Survey ||  || align=right data-sort-value="0.94" | 940 m || 
|-id=739 bgcolor=#fefefe
| 598739 ||  || — || January 24, 2009 || Cerro Burek || Alianza S4 Obs. || (2076) || align=right data-sort-value="0.60" | 600 m || 
|-id=740 bgcolor=#E9E9E9
| 598740 ||  || — || January 16, 2009 || Kitt Peak || Spacewatch ||  || align=right | 1.6 km || 
|-id=741 bgcolor=#d6d6d6
| 598741 ||  || — || January 31, 2009 || Mount Lemmon || Mount Lemmon Survey || Tj (2.98) || align=right | 2.8 km || 
|-id=742 bgcolor=#E9E9E9
| 598742 ||  || — || January 29, 2009 || Mount Lemmon || Mount Lemmon Survey ||  || align=right | 2.0 km || 
|-id=743 bgcolor=#d6d6d6
| 598743 ||  || — || January 25, 2009 || Kitt Peak || Spacewatch ||  || align=right | 2.4 km || 
|-id=744 bgcolor=#fefefe
| 598744 ||  || — || October 25, 2011 || Haleakala || Pan-STARRS ||  || align=right data-sort-value="0.58" | 580 m || 
|-id=745 bgcolor=#E9E9E9
| 598745 ||  || — || January 20, 2009 || Mount Lemmon || Mount Lemmon Survey ||  || align=right | 2.1 km || 
|-id=746 bgcolor=#E9E9E9
| 598746 ||  || — || January 20, 2009 || Mount Lemmon || Mount Lemmon Survey ||  || align=right | 1.3 km || 
|-id=747 bgcolor=#fefefe
| 598747 ||  || — || March 12, 2000 || Kitt Peak || Spacewatch ||  || align=right data-sort-value="0.49" | 490 m || 
|-id=748 bgcolor=#E9E9E9
| 598748 ||  || — || January 30, 2009 || Taunus || S. Karge, R. Kling ||  || align=right data-sort-value="0.75" | 750 m || 
|-id=749 bgcolor=#fefefe
| 598749 ||  || — || January 20, 2009 || Catalina || CSS || H || align=right data-sort-value="0.59" | 590 m || 
|-id=750 bgcolor=#E9E9E9
| 598750 ||  || — || March 11, 2014 || Kitt Peak || Spacewatch ||  || align=right | 1.7 km || 
|-id=751 bgcolor=#E9E9E9
| 598751 ||  || — || October 9, 2016 || Mount Lemmon || Mount Lemmon Survey ||  || align=right | 1.8 km || 
|-id=752 bgcolor=#E9E9E9
| 598752 ||  || — || September 4, 2011 || Haleakala || Pan-STARRS ||  || align=right | 1.7 km || 
|-id=753 bgcolor=#fefefe
| 598753 ||  || — || December 5, 2016 || Mount Lemmon || Mount Lemmon Survey || H || align=right data-sort-value="0.72" | 720 m || 
|-id=754 bgcolor=#E9E9E9
| 598754 ||  || — || January 11, 2018 || Haleakala || Pan-STARRS ||  || align=right | 1.6 km || 
|-id=755 bgcolor=#E9E9E9
| 598755 ||  || — || January 18, 2009 || Kitt Peak || Spacewatch ||  || align=right | 1.7 km || 
|-id=756 bgcolor=#d6d6d6
| 598756 ||  || — || January 31, 2009 || Mount Lemmon || Mount Lemmon Survey ||  || align=right | 2.7 km || 
|-id=757 bgcolor=#d6d6d6
| 598757 ||  || — || January 25, 2009 || Kitt Peak || Spacewatch ||  || align=right | 2.3 km || 
|-id=758 bgcolor=#d6d6d6
| 598758 ||  || — || January 17, 2009 || Kitt Peak || Spacewatch ||  || align=right | 2.1 km || 
|-id=759 bgcolor=#E9E9E9
| 598759 ||  || — || January 20, 2009 || Kitt Peak || Spacewatch ||  || align=right | 1.8 km || 
|-id=760 bgcolor=#E9E9E9
| 598760 ||  || — || January 18, 2009 || Kitt Peak || Spacewatch ||  || align=right | 1.3 km || 
|-id=761 bgcolor=#E9E9E9
| 598761 ||  || — || January 31, 2009 || Kitt Peak || Spacewatch ||  || align=right data-sort-value="0.68" | 680 m || 
|-id=762 bgcolor=#d6d6d6
| 598762 ||  || — || January 25, 2009 || Kitt Peak || Spacewatch ||  || align=right | 2.0 km || 
|-id=763 bgcolor=#E9E9E9
| 598763 ||  || — || January 16, 2009 || Mount Lemmon || Mount Lemmon Survey ||  || align=right | 1.8 km || 
|-id=764 bgcolor=#E9E9E9
| 598764 ||  || — || April 15, 2001 || Kitt Peak || Spacewatch ||  || align=right | 1.6 km || 
|-id=765 bgcolor=#fefefe
| 598765 ||  || — || February 1, 2009 || Mount Lemmon || Mount Lemmon Survey ||  || align=right data-sort-value="0.55" | 550 m || 
|-id=766 bgcolor=#E9E9E9
| 598766 ||  || — || February 1, 2009 || Mount Lemmon || Mount Lemmon Survey ||  || align=right | 1.6 km || 
|-id=767 bgcolor=#fefefe
| 598767 ||  || — || February 2, 2009 || Catalina || CSS ||  || align=right data-sort-value="0.68" | 680 m || 
|-id=768 bgcolor=#E9E9E9
| 598768 ||  || — || February 3, 2009 || Mount Lemmon || Mount Lemmon Survey ||  || align=right | 1.9 km || 
|-id=769 bgcolor=#E9E9E9
| 598769 ||  || — || February 1, 2009 || Kitt Peak || Spacewatch ||  || align=right | 1.7 km || 
|-id=770 bgcolor=#fefefe
| 598770 ||  || — || February 1, 2009 || Kitt Peak || Spacewatch ||  || align=right data-sort-value="0.44" | 440 m || 
|-id=771 bgcolor=#d6d6d6
| 598771 ||  || — || February 1, 2009 || Kitt Peak || Spacewatch ||  || align=right | 2.4 km || 
|-id=772 bgcolor=#E9E9E9
| 598772 ||  || — || February 4, 2009 || Mount Lemmon || Mount Lemmon Survey ||  || align=right | 2.0 km || 
|-id=773 bgcolor=#E9E9E9
| 598773 ||  || — || January 18, 2009 || Kitt Peak || Spacewatch ||  || align=right | 1.6 km || 
|-id=774 bgcolor=#fefefe
| 598774 ||  || — || February 1, 2009 || Kitt Peak || Spacewatch ||  || align=right data-sort-value="0.58" | 580 m || 
|-id=775 bgcolor=#E9E9E9
| 598775 ||  || — || January 3, 2009 || Mount Lemmon || Mount Lemmon Survey ||  || align=right | 1.9 km || 
|-id=776 bgcolor=#d6d6d6
| 598776 ||  || — || February 3, 2009 || Kitt Peak || Spacewatch ||  || align=right | 2.2 km || 
|-id=777 bgcolor=#d6d6d6
| 598777 ||  || — || February 3, 2009 || Kitt Peak || Spacewatch ||  || align=right | 2.3 km || 
|-id=778 bgcolor=#E9E9E9
| 598778 ||  || — || February 1, 2009 || Kitt Peak || Spacewatch ||  || align=right | 1.4 km || 
|-id=779 bgcolor=#fefefe
| 598779 ||  || — || February 2, 2009 || Kitt Peak || Spacewatch || H || align=right data-sort-value="0.53" | 530 m || 
|-id=780 bgcolor=#fefefe
| 598780 ||  || — || May 3, 2013 || Mount Lemmon || Mount Lemmon Survey ||  || align=right data-sort-value="0.67" | 670 m || 
|-id=781 bgcolor=#fefefe
| 598781 ||  || — || October 20, 2014 || Mount Lemmon || Mount Lemmon Survey ||  || align=right data-sort-value="0.61" | 610 m || 
|-id=782 bgcolor=#fefefe
| 598782 ||  || — || January 14, 2016 || Haleakala || Pan-STARRS ||  || align=right data-sort-value="0.64" | 640 m || 
|-id=783 bgcolor=#E9E9E9
| 598783 ||  || — || January 18, 2009 || Kitt Peak || Spacewatch ||  || align=right | 2.0 km || 
|-id=784 bgcolor=#fefefe
| 598784 ||  || — || January 4, 2016 || Haleakala || Pan-STARRS ||  || align=right data-sort-value="0.71" | 710 m || 
|-id=785 bgcolor=#E9E9E9
| 598785 ||  || — || July 3, 2011 || Mount Lemmon || Mount Lemmon Survey ||  || align=right | 1.9 km || 
|-id=786 bgcolor=#d6d6d6
| 598786 ||  || — || January 21, 2015 || Haleakala || Pan-STARRS ||  || align=right | 2.5 km || 
|-id=787 bgcolor=#d6d6d6
| 598787 ||  || — || February 3, 2009 || Kitt Peak || Spacewatch ||  || align=right | 2.1 km || 
|-id=788 bgcolor=#E9E9E9
| 598788 ||  || — || February 1, 2009 || Kitt Peak || Spacewatch ||  || align=right | 1.5 km || 
|-id=789 bgcolor=#E9E9E9
| 598789 ||  || — || February 2, 2009 || Mount Lemmon || Mount Lemmon Survey ||  || align=right | 1.9 km || 
|-id=790 bgcolor=#fefefe
| 598790 ||  || — || February 5, 2009 || Kitt Peak || Spacewatch || H || align=right data-sort-value="0.54" | 540 m || 
|-id=791 bgcolor=#E9E9E9
| 598791 ||  || — || January 1, 2009 || Mount Lemmon || Mount Lemmon Survey ||  || align=right | 1.3 km || 
|-id=792 bgcolor=#d6d6d6
| 598792 ||  || — || January 31, 2009 || Kitt Peak || Spacewatch ||  || align=right | 2.3 km || 
|-id=793 bgcolor=#E9E9E9
| 598793 ||  || — || February 19, 2009 || Mount Lemmon || Mount Lemmon Survey ||  || align=right | 2.1 km || 
|-id=794 bgcolor=#E9E9E9
| 598794 ||  || — || October 12, 2007 || Mount Lemmon || Mount Lemmon Survey ||  || align=right | 1.9 km || 
|-id=795 bgcolor=#E9E9E9
| 598795 ||  || — || January 3, 2009 || Mount Lemmon || Mount Lemmon Survey ||  || align=right | 1.7 km || 
|-id=796 bgcolor=#E9E9E9
| 598796 ||  || — || February 3, 2009 || Kitt Peak || Spacewatch ||  || align=right | 1.3 km || 
|-id=797 bgcolor=#fefefe
| 598797 ||  || — || January 19, 2009 || Mount Lemmon || Mount Lemmon Survey ||  || align=right data-sort-value="0.81" | 810 m || 
|-id=798 bgcolor=#d6d6d6
| 598798 ||  || — || January 31, 2009 || Mount Lemmon || Mount Lemmon Survey ||  || align=right | 2.1 km || 
|-id=799 bgcolor=#fefefe
| 598799 ||  || — || February 4, 2009 || Mount Lemmon || Mount Lemmon Survey ||  || align=right data-sort-value="0.67" | 670 m || 
|-id=800 bgcolor=#E9E9E9
| 598800 ||  || — || January 15, 2004 || Kitt Peak || Spacewatch ||  || align=right | 1.7 km || 
|}

598801–598900 

|-bgcolor=#E9E9E9
| 598801 ||  || — || February 22, 2009 || Kitt Peak || Spacewatch ||  || align=right | 1.5 km || 
|-id=802 bgcolor=#d6d6d6
| 598802 ||  || — || September 24, 2007 || Kitt Peak || Spacewatch ||  || align=right | 1.7 km || 
|-id=803 bgcolor=#E9E9E9
| 598803 ||  || — || February 1, 2009 || Mount Lemmon || Mount Lemmon Survey ||  || align=right | 2.0 km || 
|-id=804 bgcolor=#d6d6d6
| 598804 ||  || — || February 22, 2009 || Kitt Peak || Spacewatch ||  || align=right | 2.6 km || 
|-id=805 bgcolor=#E9E9E9
| 598805 ||  || — || January 19, 2009 || Mount Lemmon || Mount Lemmon Survey ||  || align=right | 1.8 km || 
|-id=806 bgcolor=#E9E9E9
| 598806 ||  || — || February 27, 2009 || Kitt Peak || Spacewatch ||  || align=right data-sort-value="0.63" | 630 m || 
|-id=807 bgcolor=#fefefe
| 598807 ||  || — || February 28, 2009 || Mount Lemmon || Mount Lemmon Survey ||  || align=right data-sort-value="0.67" | 670 m || 
|-id=808 bgcolor=#fefefe
| 598808 ||  || — || May 9, 2002 || Palomar || NEAT ||  || align=right data-sort-value="0.53" | 530 m || 
|-id=809 bgcolor=#d6d6d6
| 598809 ||  || — || February 24, 2009 || Mount Lemmon || Mount Lemmon Survey ||  || align=right | 2.1 km || 
|-id=810 bgcolor=#fefefe
| 598810 ||  || — || February 26, 2009 || Calar Alto || F. Hormuth ||  || align=right data-sort-value="0.53" | 530 m || 
|-id=811 bgcolor=#E9E9E9
| 598811 ||  || — || February 26, 2009 || Catalina || CSS ||  || align=right | 1.4 km || 
|-id=812 bgcolor=#fefefe
| 598812 ||  || — || February 27, 2009 || Kitt Peak || Spacewatch ||  || align=right data-sort-value="0.75" | 750 m || 
|-id=813 bgcolor=#fefefe
| 598813 ||  || — || February 27, 2009 || Kitt Peak || Spacewatch ||  || align=right data-sort-value="0.45" | 450 m || 
|-id=814 bgcolor=#fefefe
| 598814 ||  || — || February 27, 2009 || Kitt Peak || Spacewatch ||  || align=right data-sort-value="0.66" | 660 m || 
|-id=815 bgcolor=#d6d6d6
| 598815 ||  || — || February 19, 2009 || Kitt Peak || Spacewatch || 3:2 || align=right | 3.7 km || 
|-id=816 bgcolor=#d6d6d6
| 598816 ||  || — || February 26, 2009 || Cerro Burek || Alianza S4 Obs. ||  || align=right | 2.3 km || 
|-id=817 bgcolor=#d6d6d6
| 598817 ||  || — || February 26, 2009 || Cerro Burek || Alianza S4 Obs. ||  || align=right | 2.3 km || 
|-id=818 bgcolor=#E9E9E9
| 598818 ||  || — || February 27, 2009 || Catalina || CSS ||  || align=right | 2.6 km || 
|-id=819 bgcolor=#E9E9E9
| 598819 ||  || — || January 31, 2009 || Kitt Peak || Spacewatch ||  || align=right data-sort-value="0.92" | 920 m || 
|-id=820 bgcolor=#d6d6d6
| 598820 ||  || — || November 3, 2007 || Kitt Peak || Spacewatch ||  || align=right | 1.6 km || 
|-id=821 bgcolor=#d6d6d6
| 598821 ||  || — || December 5, 2012 || Mount Lemmon || Mount Lemmon Survey ||  || align=right | 2.0 km || 
|-id=822 bgcolor=#E9E9E9
| 598822 ||  || — || February 20, 2009 || Mount Lemmon || Mount Lemmon Survey ||  || align=right | 1.7 km || 
|-id=823 bgcolor=#E9E9E9
| 598823 ||  || — || November 13, 2012 || Kitt Peak || Spacewatch ||  || align=right | 1.6 km || 
|-id=824 bgcolor=#d6d6d6
| 598824 ||  || — || February 20, 2009 || Kitt Peak || Spacewatch ||  || align=right | 2.8 km || 
|-id=825 bgcolor=#E9E9E9
| 598825 ||  || — || February 20, 2009 || Kitt Peak || Spacewatch ||  || align=right | 1.9 km || 
|-id=826 bgcolor=#d6d6d6
| 598826 ||  || — || February 19, 2009 || Kitt Peak || Spacewatch ||  || align=right | 1.9 km || 
|-id=827 bgcolor=#fefefe
| 598827 ||  || — || February 27, 2009 || Catalina || CSS || H || align=right data-sort-value="0.61" | 610 m || 
|-id=828 bgcolor=#fefefe
| 598828 ||  || — || February 20, 2009 || Mount Lemmon || Mount Lemmon Survey ||  || align=right data-sort-value="0.68" | 680 m || 
|-id=829 bgcolor=#d6d6d6
| 598829 ||  || — || July 27, 2017 || Haleakala || Pan-STARRS ||  || align=right | 2.4 km || 
|-id=830 bgcolor=#E9E9E9
| 598830 ||  || — || January 18, 2009 || Kitt Peak || Spacewatch ||  || align=right data-sort-value="0.76" | 760 m || 
|-id=831 bgcolor=#fefefe
| 598831 ||  || — || February 27, 2009 || Mount Lemmon || Mount Lemmon Survey ||  || align=right data-sort-value="0.50" | 500 m || 
|-id=832 bgcolor=#d6d6d6
| 598832 ||  || — || February 26, 2009 || Kitt Peak || Spacewatch ||  || align=right | 2.7 km || 
|-id=833 bgcolor=#d6d6d6
| 598833 ||  || — || February 28, 2009 || Kitt Peak || Spacewatch ||  || align=right | 1.7 km || 
|-id=834 bgcolor=#d6d6d6
| 598834 ||  || — || February 28, 2009 || Kitt Peak || Spacewatch ||  || align=right | 2.5 km || 
|-id=835 bgcolor=#d6d6d6
| 598835 ||  || — || February 16, 2009 || Kitt Peak || Spacewatch ||  || align=right | 2.4 km || 
|-id=836 bgcolor=#E9E9E9
| 598836 ||  || — || February 16, 2009 || Catalina || CSS ||  || align=right data-sort-value="0.83" | 830 m || 
|-id=837 bgcolor=#fefefe
| 598837 ||  || — || March 16, 2009 || XuYi || PMO NEO || H || align=right data-sort-value="0.67" | 670 m || 
|-id=838 bgcolor=#E9E9E9
| 598838 ||  || — || February 3, 2009 || Mount Lemmon || Mount Lemmon Survey ||  || align=right | 1.3 km || 
|-id=839 bgcolor=#d6d6d6
| 598839 ||  || — || March 2, 2009 || Mount Lemmon || Mount Lemmon Survey ||  || align=right | 3.0 km || 
|-id=840 bgcolor=#fefefe
| 598840 ||  || — || March 2, 2009 || Mount Lemmon || Mount Lemmon Survey ||  || align=right data-sort-value="0.68" | 680 m || 
|-id=841 bgcolor=#fefefe
| 598841 ||  || — || February 19, 2009 || Kitt Peak || Spacewatch ||  || align=right data-sort-value="0.55" | 550 m || 
|-id=842 bgcolor=#fefefe
| 598842 ||  || — || February 20, 2009 || Mount Lemmon || Mount Lemmon Survey ||  || align=right data-sort-value="0.44" | 440 m || 
|-id=843 bgcolor=#fefefe
| 598843 ||  || — || March 15, 2009 || Kitt Peak || Spacewatch ||  || align=right data-sort-value="0.74" | 740 m || 
|-id=844 bgcolor=#fefefe
| 598844 ||  || — || June 18, 2013 || Haleakala || Pan-STARRS ||  || align=right data-sort-value="0.48" | 480 m || 
|-id=845 bgcolor=#d6d6d6
| 598845 ||  || — || May 18, 2015 || Haleakala || Pan-STARRS ||  || align=right | 2.1 km || 
|-id=846 bgcolor=#E9E9E9
| 598846 ||  || — || February 14, 2013 || Kitt Peak || Spacewatch ||  || align=right data-sort-value="0.81" | 810 m || 
|-id=847 bgcolor=#fefefe
| 598847 ||  || — || October 2, 2010 || Kitt Peak || Spacewatch ||  || align=right data-sort-value="0.60" | 600 m || 
|-id=848 bgcolor=#fefefe
| 598848 ||  || — || May 16, 2013 || Haleakala || Pan-STARRS ||  || align=right data-sort-value="0.60" | 600 m || 
|-id=849 bgcolor=#fefefe
| 598849 ||  || — || March 3, 2009 || Mount Lemmon || Mount Lemmon Survey ||  || align=right data-sort-value="0.64" | 640 m || 
|-id=850 bgcolor=#E9E9E9
| 598850 ||  || — || March 3, 2009 || Mount Lemmon || Mount Lemmon Survey ||  || align=right | 1.5 km || 
|-id=851 bgcolor=#d6d6d6
| 598851 ||  || — || March 2, 2009 || Mount Lemmon || Mount Lemmon Survey ||  || align=right | 2.2 km || 
|-id=852 bgcolor=#d6d6d6
| 598852 ||  || — || March 2, 2009 || Kitt Peak || Spacewatch ||  || align=right | 1.8 km || 
|-id=853 bgcolor=#fefefe
| 598853 ||  || — || March 17, 2009 || Taunus || E. Schwab, R. Kling ||  || align=right data-sort-value="0.66" | 660 m || 
|-id=854 bgcolor=#fefefe
| 598854 ||  || — || February 3, 2009 || Mount Lemmon || Mount Lemmon Survey ||  || align=right data-sort-value="0.50" | 500 m || 
|-id=855 bgcolor=#fefefe
| 598855 ||  || — || February 26, 2009 || Calar Alto || F. Hormuth ||  || align=right data-sort-value="0.96" | 960 m || 
|-id=856 bgcolor=#fefefe
| 598856 ||  || — || February 27, 2009 || Mount Lemmon || Mount Lemmon Survey ||  || align=right data-sort-value="0.74" | 740 m || 
|-id=857 bgcolor=#fefefe
| 598857 ||  || — || January 31, 2009 || Mount Lemmon || Mount Lemmon Survey ||  || align=right data-sort-value="0.97" | 970 m || 
|-id=858 bgcolor=#E9E9E9
| 598858 ||  || — || March 25, 2009 || Mount Lemmon || Mount Lemmon Survey ||  || align=right | 2.2 km || 
|-id=859 bgcolor=#E9E9E9
| 598859 ||  || — || November 21, 2003 || Kitt Peak || Spacewatch ||  || align=right data-sort-value="0.94" | 940 m || 
|-id=860 bgcolor=#d6d6d6
| 598860 ||  || — || January 29, 2009 || Mount Lemmon || Mount Lemmon Survey ||  || align=right | 2.2 km || 
|-id=861 bgcolor=#fefefe
| 598861 ||  || — || March 28, 2009 || Kitt Peak || Spacewatch ||  || align=right data-sort-value="0.60" | 600 m || 
|-id=862 bgcolor=#d6d6d6
| 598862 ||  || — || March 28, 2009 || Mount Lemmon || Mount Lemmon Survey || Tj (2.99) || align=right | 2.5 km || 
|-id=863 bgcolor=#fefefe
| 598863 ||  || — || March 26, 2009 || Mount Lemmon || Mount Lemmon Survey ||  || align=right data-sort-value="0.56" | 560 m || 
|-id=864 bgcolor=#E9E9E9
| 598864 ||  || — || March 27, 2009 || Mount Lemmon || Mount Lemmon Survey ||  || align=right | 1.8 km || 
|-id=865 bgcolor=#FA8072
| 598865 ||  || — || March 28, 2009 || Catalina || CSS ||  || align=right | 1.0 km || 
|-id=866 bgcolor=#d6d6d6
| 598866 ||  || — || August 29, 2006 || Kitt Peak || Spacewatch ||  || align=right | 2.7 km || 
|-id=867 bgcolor=#fefefe
| 598867 ||  || — || March 19, 2009 || Mount Lemmon || Mount Lemmon Survey ||  || align=right data-sort-value="0.66" | 660 m || 
|-id=868 bgcolor=#fefefe
| 598868 ||  || — || February 28, 2009 || Kitt Peak || Spacewatch ||  || align=right data-sort-value="0.59" | 590 m || 
|-id=869 bgcolor=#fefefe
| 598869 ||  || — || April 10, 2013 || Haleakala || Pan-STARRS ||  || align=right data-sort-value="0.82" | 820 m || 
|-id=870 bgcolor=#d6d6d6
| 598870 ||  || — || February 26, 2014 || Haleakala || Pan-STARRS ||  || align=right | 1.9 km || 
|-id=871 bgcolor=#fefefe
| 598871 ||  || — || February 9, 2016 || Haleakala || Pan-STARRS ||  || align=right data-sort-value="0.64" | 640 m || 
|-id=872 bgcolor=#fefefe
| 598872 ||  || — || March 24, 2009 || Mount Lemmon || Mount Lemmon Survey || H || align=right data-sort-value="0.56" | 560 m || 
|-id=873 bgcolor=#E9E9E9
| 598873 ||  || — || April 8, 2014 || Haleakala || Pan-STARRS ||  || align=right | 2.1 km || 
|-id=874 bgcolor=#d6d6d6
| 598874 ||  || — || February 22, 2009 || Kitt Peak || Spacewatch || 3:2 || align=right | 3.2 km || 
|-id=875 bgcolor=#E9E9E9
| 598875 ||  || — || May 8, 2014 || Haleakala || Pan-STARRS ||  || align=right | 1.3 km || 
|-id=876 bgcolor=#fefefe
| 598876 ||  || — || June 12, 2013 || Haleakala || Pan-STARRS ||  || align=right data-sort-value="0.42" | 420 m || 
|-id=877 bgcolor=#d6d6d6
| 598877 ||  || — || November 7, 2012 || Haleakala || Pan-STARRS ||  || align=right | 2.2 km || 
|-id=878 bgcolor=#fefefe
| 598878 ||  || — || November 24, 2014 || Mount Lemmon || Mount Lemmon Survey ||  || align=right data-sort-value="0.60" | 600 m || 
|-id=879 bgcolor=#d6d6d6
| 598879 ||  || — || March 31, 2009 || Kitt Peak || Spacewatch ||  || align=right | 1.9 km || 
|-id=880 bgcolor=#fefefe
| 598880 ||  || — || March 26, 2009 || Mount Lemmon || Mount Lemmon Survey ||  || align=right data-sort-value="0.95" | 950 m || 
|-id=881 bgcolor=#fefefe
| 598881 ||  || — || March 28, 2009 || Mount Lemmon || Mount Lemmon Survey ||  || align=right data-sort-value="0.64" | 640 m || 
|-id=882 bgcolor=#fefefe
| 598882 ||  || — || March 31, 2009 || Kitt Peak || Spacewatch ||  || align=right data-sort-value="0.62" | 620 m || 
|-id=883 bgcolor=#E9E9E9
| 598883 ||  || — || March 19, 2009 || Kitt Peak || Spacewatch ||  || align=right | 1.4 km || 
|-id=884 bgcolor=#E9E9E9
| 598884 ||  || — || March 28, 2009 || Kitt Peak || Spacewatch ||  || align=right | 1.7 km || 
|-id=885 bgcolor=#fefefe
| 598885 ||  || — || April 3, 2009 || Cerro Burek || Alianza S4 Obs. ||  || align=right data-sort-value="0.77" | 770 m || 
|-id=886 bgcolor=#d6d6d6
| 598886 ||  || — || April 2, 2009 || Mount Lemmon || Mount Lemmon Survey ||  || align=right | 2.4 km || 
|-id=887 bgcolor=#E9E9E9
| 598887 ||  || — || March 5, 2013 || Mount Lemmon || Mount Lemmon Survey ||  || align=right | 1.3 km || 
|-id=888 bgcolor=#fefefe
| 598888 ||  || — || March 15, 2009 || Kitt Peak || Spacewatch ||  || align=right data-sort-value="0.72" | 720 m || 
|-id=889 bgcolor=#d6d6d6
| 598889 ||  || — || April 2, 2009 || Kitt Peak || Spacewatch ||  || align=right | 1.9 km || 
|-id=890 bgcolor=#d6d6d6
| 598890 ||  || — || August 5, 2005 || Palomar || NEAT ||  || align=right | 3.0 km || 
|-id=891 bgcolor=#fefefe
| 598891 ||  || — || February 5, 2009 || Catalina || CSS ||  || align=right | 1.1 km || 
|-id=892 bgcolor=#fefefe
| 598892 ||  || — || April 17, 2009 || Catalina || CSS ||  || align=right data-sort-value="0.63" | 630 m || 
|-id=893 bgcolor=#fefefe
| 598893 ||  || — || March 28, 2009 || Kitt Peak || Spacewatch ||  || align=right data-sort-value="0.55" | 550 m || 
|-id=894 bgcolor=#E9E9E9
| 598894 ||  || — || March 24, 2009 || Mount Lemmon || Mount Lemmon Survey ||  || align=right | 2.0 km || 
|-id=895 bgcolor=#d6d6d6
| 598895 ||  || — || April 16, 2009 || Baldone || I. Eglītis ||  || align=right | 2.2 km || 
|-id=896 bgcolor=#fefefe
| 598896 ||  || — || March 29, 2009 || Mount Lemmon || Mount Lemmon Survey ||  || align=right data-sort-value="0.57" | 570 m || 
|-id=897 bgcolor=#d6d6d6
| 598897 ||  || — || April 19, 2009 || Kitt Peak || Spacewatch ||  || align=right | 2.3 km || 
|-id=898 bgcolor=#fefefe
| 598898 ||  || — || March 18, 2009 || Kitt Peak || Spacewatch ||  || align=right data-sort-value="0.54" | 540 m || 
|-id=899 bgcolor=#d6d6d6
| 598899 ||  || — || April 2, 2009 || Mount Lemmon || Mount Lemmon Survey ||  || align=right | 1.8 km || 
|-id=900 bgcolor=#d6d6d6
| 598900 ||  || — || April 19, 2009 || Kitt Peak || Spacewatch ||  || align=right | 2.6 km || 
|}

598901–599000 

|-bgcolor=#d6d6d6
| 598901 ||  || — || April 19, 2009 || Kitt Peak || Spacewatch ||  || align=right | 1.9 km || 
|-id=902 bgcolor=#fefefe
| 598902 ||  || — || April 20, 2009 || Kitt Peak || Spacewatch ||  || align=right data-sort-value="0.61" | 610 m || 
|-id=903 bgcolor=#fefefe
| 598903 ||  || — || May 4, 2002 || Palomar || NEAT ||  || align=right data-sort-value="0.66" | 660 m || 
|-id=904 bgcolor=#fefefe
| 598904 ||  || — || April 20, 2009 || Kitt Peak || Spacewatch ||  || align=right data-sort-value="0.87" | 870 m || 
|-id=905 bgcolor=#fefefe
| 598905 ||  || — || April 19, 2009 || Kitt Peak || Spacewatch ||  || align=right data-sort-value="0.63" | 630 m || 
|-id=906 bgcolor=#fefefe
| 598906 ||  || — || April 21, 2009 || Kitt Peak || Spacewatch ||  || align=right data-sort-value="0.53" | 530 m || 
|-id=907 bgcolor=#E9E9E9
| 598907 ||  || — || April 23, 2009 || Mount Lemmon || Mount Lemmon Survey ||  || align=right | 2.8 km || 
|-id=908 bgcolor=#fefefe
| 598908 ||  || — || March 31, 2009 || Kitt Peak || Spacewatch ||  || align=right data-sort-value="0.56" | 560 m || 
|-id=909 bgcolor=#fefefe
| 598909 ||  || — || October 16, 2007 || Mount Lemmon || Mount Lemmon Survey ||  || align=right data-sort-value="0.74" | 740 m || 
|-id=910 bgcolor=#d6d6d6
| 598910 ||  || — || April 26, 2009 || Kitt Peak || Spacewatch ||  || align=right | 2.0 km || 
|-id=911 bgcolor=#fefefe
| 598911 ||  || — || November 4, 1999 || Kitt Peak || Spacewatch || H || align=right data-sort-value="0.46" | 460 m || 
|-id=912 bgcolor=#fefefe
| 598912 ||  || — || April 22, 2009 || Mount Lemmon || Mount Lemmon Survey ||  || align=right data-sort-value="0.51" | 510 m || 
|-id=913 bgcolor=#E9E9E9
| 598913 ||  || — || April 26, 2009 || Mount Lemmon || Mount Lemmon Survey ||  || align=right | 2.3 km || 
|-id=914 bgcolor=#fefefe
| 598914 ||  || — || April 18, 2009 || Kitt Peak || Spacewatch ||  || align=right data-sort-value="0.67" | 670 m || 
|-id=915 bgcolor=#fefefe
| 598915 ||  || — || April 18, 2009 || Mount Lemmon || Mount Lemmon Survey ||  || align=right data-sort-value="0.53" | 530 m || 
|-id=916 bgcolor=#d6d6d6
| 598916 ||  || — || August 31, 2005 || Kitt Peak || Spacewatch ||  || align=right | 2.4 km || 
|-id=917 bgcolor=#d6d6d6
| 598917 ||  || — || April 24, 2009 || Cerro Burek || Alianza S4 Obs. ||  || align=right | 2.4 km || 
|-id=918 bgcolor=#fefefe
| 598918 ||  || — || November 7, 2007 || Kitt Peak || Spacewatch ||  || align=right data-sort-value="0.73" | 730 m || 
|-id=919 bgcolor=#fefefe
| 598919 ||  || — || March 4, 2005 || Mount Lemmon || Mount Lemmon Survey ||  || align=right data-sort-value="0.73" | 730 m || 
|-id=920 bgcolor=#fefefe
| 598920 ||  || — || April 20, 2009 || Mount Lemmon || Mount Lemmon Survey ||  || align=right data-sort-value="0.62" | 620 m || 
|-id=921 bgcolor=#fefefe
| 598921 ||  || — || April 21, 2009 || Kitt Peak || Spacewatch ||  || align=right data-sort-value="0.54" | 540 m || 
|-id=922 bgcolor=#d6d6d6
| 598922 ||  || — || April 22, 2009 || Mount Lemmon || Mount Lemmon Survey ||  || align=right | 1.6 km || 
|-id=923 bgcolor=#fefefe
| 598923 ||  || — || April 21, 2009 || Kitt Peak || Spacewatch ||  || align=right data-sort-value="0.62" | 620 m || 
|-id=924 bgcolor=#d6d6d6
| 598924 ||  || — || April 1, 2003 || Palomar || NEAT ||  || align=right | 3.4 km || 
|-id=925 bgcolor=#d6d6d6
| 598925 ||  || — || December 18, 2007 || Mount Lemmon || Mount Lemmon Survey ||  || align=right | 2.7 km || 
|-id=926 bgcolor=#d6d6d6
| 598926 ||  || — || October 25, 2000 || La Silla ||  ||  || align=right | 2.5 km || 
|-id=927 bgcolor=#E9E9E9
| 598927 ||  || — || August 16, 2001 || Socorro || LINEAR ||  || align=right | 2.2 km || 
|-id=928 bgcolor=#fefefe
| 598928 ||  || — || April 21, 2009 || Kitt Peak || Spacewatch ||  || align=right data-sort-value="0.58" | 580 m || 
|-id=929 bgcolor=#fefefe
| 598929 ||  || — || May 4, 2009 || Mount Lemmon || Mount Lemmon Survey ||  || align=right data-sort-value="0.60" | 600 m || 
|-id=930 bgcolor=#fefefe
| 598930 ||  || — || April 18, 2009 || Kitt Peak || Spacewatch ||  || align=right data-sort-value="0.74" | 740 m || 
|-id=931 bgcolor=#d6d6d6
| 598931 ||  || — || April 5, 2014 || Haleakala || Pan-STARRS ||  || align=right | 1.8 km || 
|-id=932 bgcolor=#d6d6d6
| 598932 ||  || — || February 26, 2014 || Haleakala || Pan-STARRS ||  || align=right | 2.1 km || 
|-id=933 bgcolor=#fefefe
| 598933 ||  || — || April 18, 2009 || Kitt Peak || Spacewatch ||  || align=right data-sort-value="0.66" | 660 m || 
|-id=934 bgcolor=#d6d6d6
| 598934 ||  || — || January 17, 2016 || Haleakala || Pan-STARRS || 3:2 || align=right | 3.3 km || 
|-id=935 bgcolor=#fefefe
| 598935 ||  || — || April 24, 2009 || Mount Lemmon || Mount Lemmon Survey ||  || align=right data-sort-value="0.63" | 630 m || 
|-id=936 bgcolor=#d6d6d6
| 598936 ||  || — || February 28, 2009 || Kitt Peak || Spacewatch || 3:2 || align=right | 3.7 km || 
|-id=937 bgcolor=#E9E9E9
| 598937 ||  || — || July 25, 2015 || Haleakala || Pan-STARRS ||  || align=right | 1.9 km || 
|-id=938 bgcolor=#d6d6d6
| 598938 ||  || — || October 5, 2016 || Mount Lemmon || Mount Lemmon Survey ||  || align=right | 2.0 km || 
|-id=939 bgcolor=#d6d6d6
| 598939 ||  || — || February 16, 2013 || Kitt Peak || Spacewatch ||  || align=right | 2.1 km || 
|-id=940 bgcolor=#d6d6d6
| 598940 ||  || — || April 24, 2009 || Mount Lemmon || Mount Lemmon Survey ||  || align=right | 2.1 km || 
|-id=941 bgcolor=#fefefe
| 598941 ||  || — || April 22, 2009 || Mount Lemmon || Mount Lemmon Survey ||  || align=right data-sort-value="0.51" | 510 m || 
|-id=942 bgcolor=#E9E9E9
| 598942 ||  || — || April 30, 2009 || Mount Lemmon || Mount Lemmon Survey ||  || align=right data-sort-value="0.98" | 980 m || 
|-id=943 bgcolor=#fefefe
| 598943 ||  || — || March 28, 2009 || Kitt Peak || Spacewatch ||  || align=right data-sort-value="0.60" | 600 m || 
|-id=944 bgcolor=#fefefe
| 598944 ||  || — || May 13, 2009 || Kitt Peak || Spacewatch ||  || align=right data-sort-value="0.50" | 500 m || 
|-id=945 bgcolor=#fefefe
| 598945 ||  || — || May 13, 2009 || Kitt Peak || Spacewatch ||  || align=right data-sort-value="0.57" | 570 m || 
|-id=946 bgcolor=#d6d6d6
| 598946 ||  || — || May 13, 2009 || Kitt Peak || Spacewatch ||  || align=right | 2.6 km || 
|-id=947 bgcolor=#fefefe
| 598947 ||  || — || April 20, 2009 || Kitt Peak || Spacewatch ||  || align=right data-sort-value="0.54" | 540 m || 
|-id=948 bgcolor=#d6d6d6
| 598948 ||  || — || May 14, 2009 || Kitt Peak || Spacewatch ||  || align=right | 3.2 km || 
|-id=949 bgcolor=#d6d6d6
| 598949 ||  || — || August 22, 1995 || Kitt Peak || Spacewatch ||  || align=right | 2.3 km || 
|-id=950 bgcolor=#fefefe
| 598950 ||  || — || May 2, 2009 || Cerro Burek || Alianza S4 Obs. ||  || align=right data-sort-value="0.64" | 640 m || 
|-id=951 bgcolor=#fefefe
| 598951 ||  || — || May 15, 2009 || Kitt Peak || Spacewatch ||  || align=right data-sort-value="0.58" | 580 m || 
|-id=952 bgcolor=#fefefe
| 598952 ||  || — || November 11, 2010 || Mount Lemmon || Mount Lemmon Survey ||  || align=right data-sort-value="0.75" | 750 m || 
|-id=953 bgcolor=#fefefe
| 598953 ||  || — || February 6, 2016 || Haleakala || Pan-STARRS ||  || align=right data-sort-value="0.58" | 580 m || 
|-id=954 bgcolor=#fefefe
| 598954 ||  || — || May 2, 2009 || Catalina || CSS ||  || align=right data-sort-value="0.64" | 640 m || 
|-id=955 bgcolor=#d6d6d6
| 598955 ||  || — || April 5, 2014 || Haleakala || Pan-STARRS ||  || align=right | 2.1 km || 
|-id=956 bgcolor=#fefefe
| 598956 ||  || — || May 13, 2009 || Kitt Peak || Spacewatch ||  || align=right data-sort-value="0.51" | 510 m || 
|-id=957 bgcolor=#fefefe
| 598957 ||  || — || May 1, 2009 || Mount Lemmon || Mount Lemmon Survey ||  || align=right data-sort-value="0.67" | 670 m || 
|-id=958 bgcolor=#fefefe
| 598958 ||  || — || May 13, 2009 || Kitt Peak || Spacewatch ||  || align=right data-sort-value="0.59" | 590 m || 
|-id=959 bgcolor=#d6d6d6
| 598959 ||  || — || May 25, 2009 || Mount Lemmon || Mount Lemmon Survey ||  || align=right | 2.6 km || 
|-id=960 bgcolor=#fefefe
| 598960 ||  || — || May 27, 2009 || Hibiscus || N. Teamo ||  || align=right data-sort-value="0.59" | 590 m || 
|-id=961 bgcolor=#fefefe
| 598961 ||  || — || March 25, 2009 || Mount Lemmon || Mount Lemmon Survey ||  || align=right data-sort-value="0.84" | 840 m || 
|-id=962 bgcolor=#fefefe
| 598962 ||  || — || May 26, 2009 || Kitt Peak || Spacewatch ||  || align=right data-sort-value="0.67" | 670 m || 
|-id=963 bgcolor=#fefefe
| 598963 ||  || — || May 27, 2009 || Mount Lemmon || Mount Lemmon Survey ||  || align=right data-sort-value="0.80" | 800 m || 
|-id=964 bgcolor=#FA8072
| 598964 ||  || — || May 29, 2009 || Bergisch Gladbach || W. Bickel || H || align=right data-sort-value="0.58" | 580 m || 
|-id=965 bgcolor=#d6d6d6
| 598965 ||  || — || May 17, 2009 || Mount Lemmon || Mount Lemmon Survey ||  || align=right | 2.7 km || 
|-id=966 bgcolor=#fefefe
| 598966 ||  || — || May 30, 2009 || Bergisch Gladbach || W. Bickel ||  || align=right data-sort-value="0.95" | 950 m || 
|-id=967 bgcolor=#fefefe
| 598967 ||  || — || May 29, 2009 || Mount Lemmon || Mount Lemmon Survey ||  || align=right data-sort-value="0.59" | 590 m || 
|-id=968 bgcolor=#fefefe
| 598968 ||  || — || February 12, 2008 || Mount Lemmon || Mount Lemmon Survey ||  || align=right data-sort-value="0.91" | 910 m || 
|-id=969 bgcolor=#E9E9E9
| 598969 ||  || — || June 3, 2005 || Siding Spring || SSS ||  || align=right | 1.5 km || 
|-id=970 bgcolor=#d6d6d6
| 598970 ||  || — || January 29, 2014 || Kitt Peak || Spacewatch ||  || align=right | 2.8 km || 
|-id=971 bgcolor=#E9E9E9
| 598971 ||  || — || November 8, 2010 || Mount Lemmon || Mount Lemmon Survey ||  || align=right | 1.3 km || 
|-id=972 bgcolor=#fefefe
| 598972 ||  || — || January 14, 2016 || Haleakala || Pan-STARRS ||  || align=right data-sort-value="0.54" | 540 m || 
|-id=973 bgcolor=#fefefe
| 598973 ||  || — || May 16, 2009 || Mount Lemmon || Mount Lemmon Survey ||  || align=right data-sort-value="0.45" | 450 m || 
|-id=974 bgcolor=#d6d6d6
| 598974 ||  || — || June 13, 2015 || Haleakala || Pan-STARRS ||  || align=right | 2.5 km || 
|-id=975 bgcolor=#fefefe
| 598975 ||  || — || September 30, 2010 || Mount Lemmon || Mount Lemmon Survey ||  || align=right data-sort-value="0.67" | 670 m || 
|-id=976 bgcolor=#d6d6d6
| 598976 ||  || — || May 30, 2009 || Mount Lemmon || Mount Lemmon Survey ||  || align=right | 2.1 km || 
|-id=977 bgcolor=#fefefe
| 598977 ||  || — || May 17, 2009 || Kitt Peak || Spacewatch ||  || align=right data-sort-value="0.66" | 660 m || 
|-id=978 bgcolor=#fefefe
| 598978 ||  || — || May 28, 2009 || Mount Lemmon || Mount Lemmon Survey ||  || align=right data-sort-value="0.67" | 670 m || 
|-id=979 bgcolor=#E9E9E9
| 598979 ||  || — || May 18, 2009 || Mount Lemmon || Mount Lemmon Survey ||  || align=right | 1.2 km || 
|-id=980 bgcolor=#d6d6d6
| 598980 ||  || — || June 22, 2004 || Kitt Peak || Spacewatch ||  || align=right | 2.2 km || 
|-id=981 bgcolor=#fefefe
| 598981 ||  || — || June 14, 2009 || Kitt Peak || Spacewatch ||  || align=right data-sort-value="0.90" | 900 m || 
|-id=982 bgcolor=#d6d6d6
| 598982 ||  || — || June 17, 2009 || Kitt Peak || Spacewatch ||  || align=right | 3.1 km || 
|-id=983 bgcolor=#fefefe
| 598983 ||  || — || June 19, 2009 || Mount Lemmon || Mount Lemmon Survey || H || align=right data-sort-value="0.64" | 640 m || 
|-id=984 bgcolor=#fefefe
| 598984 ||  || — || July 14, 2009 || Kitt Peak || Spacewatch ||  || align=right data-sort-value="0.71" | 710 m || 
|-id=985 bgcolor=#fefefe
| 598985 ||  || — || July 19, 2009 || Crni Vrh || S. Matičič || H || align=right data-sort-value="0.63" | 630 m || 
|-id=986 bgcolor=#d6d6d6
| 598986 ||  || — || July 27, 2009 || Catalina || CSS || EUP || align=right | 4.1 km || 
|-id=987 bgcolor=#fefefe
| 598987 ||  || — || July 26, 2009 || Farra d'Isonzo || Farra d'Isonzo || H || align=right data-sort-value="0.62" | 620 m || 
|-id=988 bgcolor=#fefefe
| 598988 ||  || — || July 27, 2009 || Kitt Peak || Spacewatch ||  || align=right data-sort-value="0.69" | 690 m || 
|-id=989 bgcolor=#d6d6d6
| 598989 ||  || — || July 28, 2009 || Calvin-Rehoboth || L. A. Molnar ||  || align=right | 2.9 km || 
|-id=990 bgcolor=#d6d6d6
| 598990 ||  || — || July 27, 2009 || Kitt Peak || Spacewatch ||  || align=right | 2.5 km || 
|-id=991 bgcolor=#d6d6d6
| 598991 ||  || — || July 27, 2009 || Kitt Peak || Spacewatch ||  || align=right | 2.9 km || 
|-id=992 bgcolor=#d6d6d6
| 598992 ||  || — || July 30, 2009 || Catalina || CSS ||  || align=right | 2.6 km || 
|-id=993 bgcolor=#fefefe
| 598993 ||  || — || July 28, 2009 || Kitt Peak || Spacewatch ||  || align=right data-sort-value="0.71" | 710 m || 
|-id=994 bgcolor=#d6d6d6
| 598994 ||  || — || June 24, 2009 || Kitt Peak || Spacewatch ||  || align=right | 2.8 km || 
|-id=995 bgcolor=#d6d6d6
| 598995 ||  || — || July 29, 2009 || Kitt Peak || Spacewatch ||  || align=right | 2.7 km || 
|-id=996 bgcolor=#d6d6d6
| 598996 ||  || — || November 13, 2010 || Mount Lemmon || Mount Lemmon Survey ||  || align=right | 2.9 km || 
|-id=997 bgcolor=#d6d6d6
| 598997 ||  || — || August 14, 2014 || Haleakala || Pan-STARRS ||  || align=right | 2.5 km || 
|-id=998 bgcolor=#d6d6d6
| 598998 ||  || — || July 31, 2009 || Kitt Peak || Spacewatch ||  || align=right | 2.5 km || 
|-id=999 bgcolor=#fefefe
| 598999 ||  || — || February 29, 2012 || Mount Lemmon || Mount Lemmon Survey ||  || align=right data-sort-value="0.73" | 730 m || 
|-id=000 bgcolor=#d6d6d6
| 599000 ||  || — || July 29, 2009 || Kitt Peak || Spacewatch ||  || align=right | 2.6 km || 
|}

References

External links 
 Discovery Circumstances: Numbered Minor Planets (595001)–(600000) (IAU Minor Planet Center)

0598